= Transport in Latvia =

This article provides an overview of the transport infrastructure of Latvia.

== Road system ==
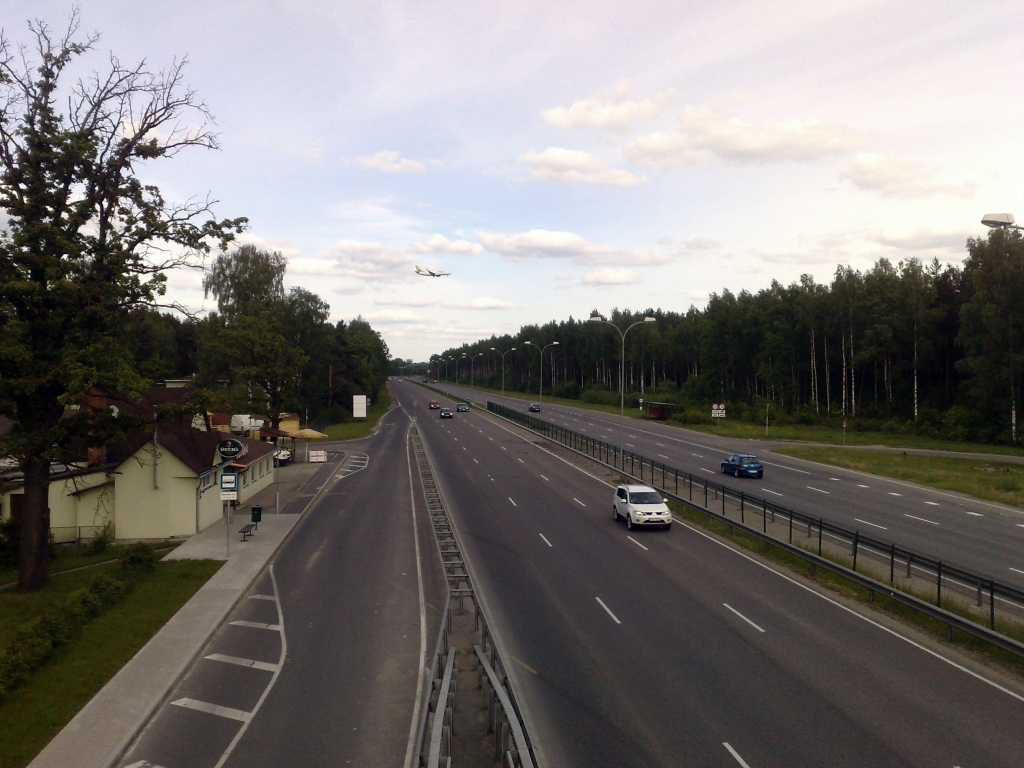
A10 near Rīga

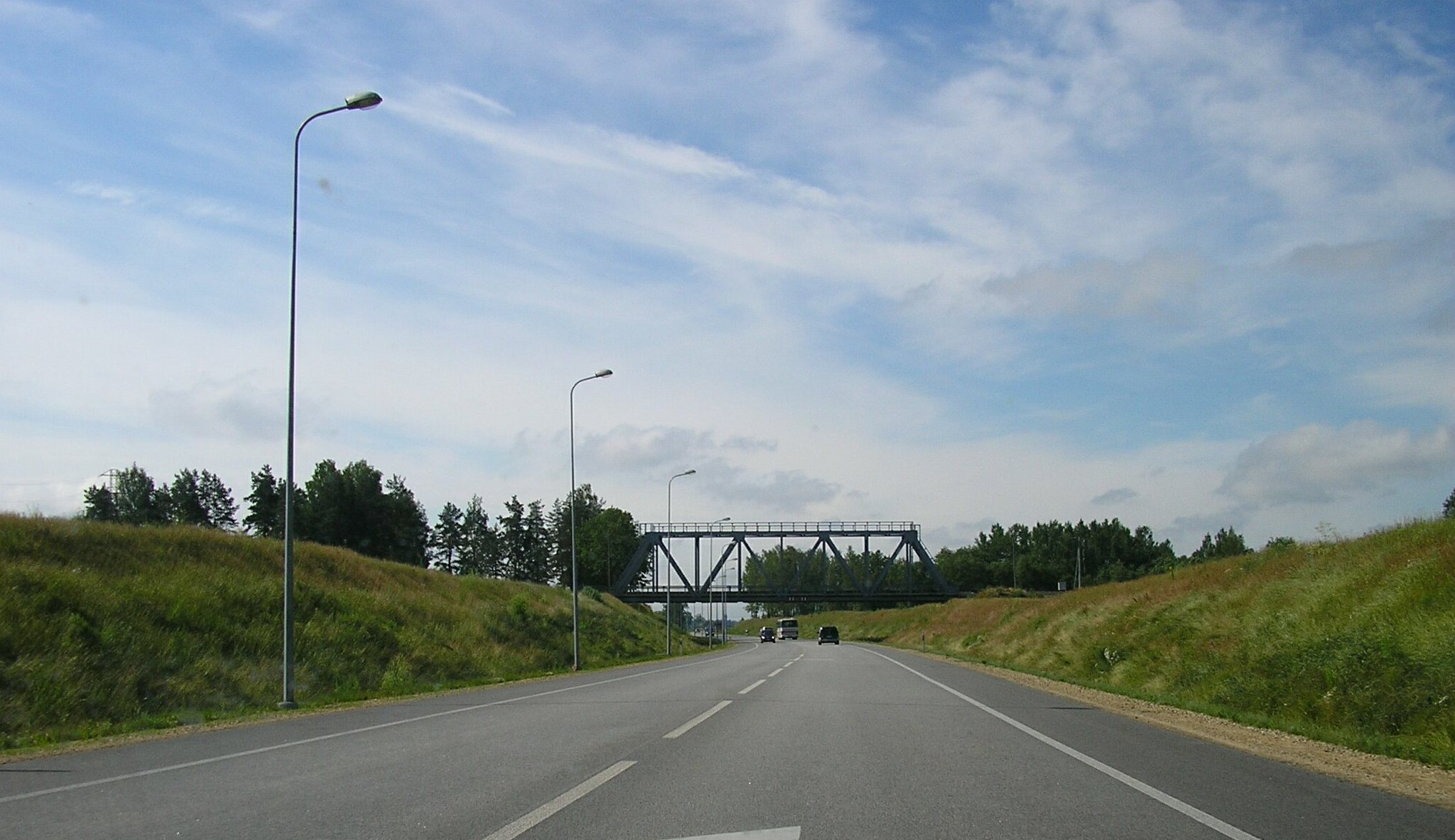
A7 near Iecava

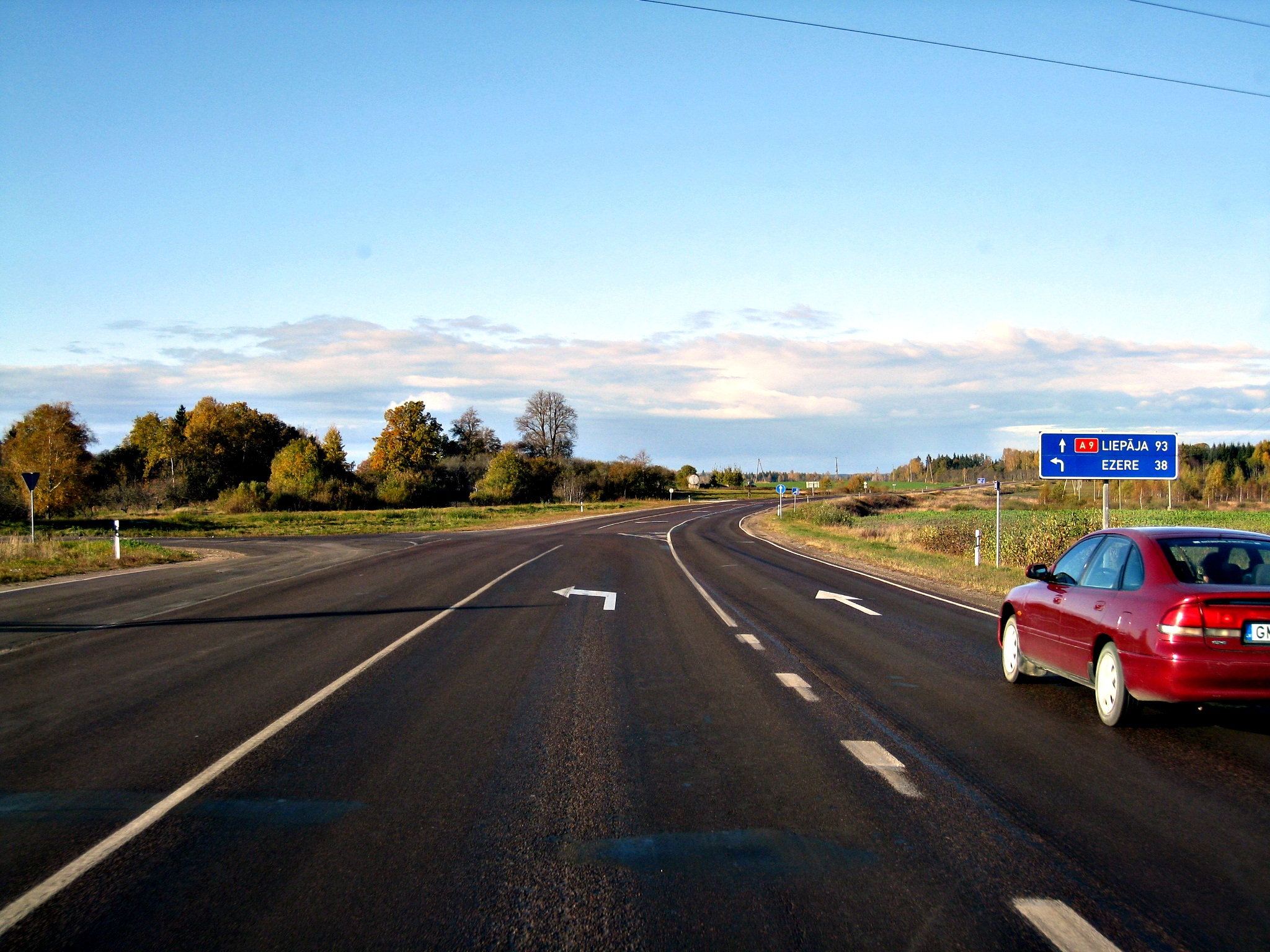
A9 near Skrunda

It is mandatory to keep headlights on while driving, even in daylight; most cars commercially sold in Latvia are equipped to make this automatic.

=== Highways ===
| Number | E-road | Route | Length (km) |
|---|---|---|---|
| A1 | E67 | Rīga - Ainaži (EE border) | 101 |
| A2 | E77 | Rīga - Sigulda - Veclaicene (EE border) | 196 |
| A3 | E264 | Inčukalns - Valmiera - Valka (EE border) | 101 |
| A4 | E67 E77 | Rīga ring road (Baltezers - Saulkalne) | 20 |
| A5 | E67 E77 | Rīga ring road (Salaspils - Babīte) | 40 |
| A6 | E22 E262 | Rīga - Daugavpils - Krāslava - Pāternieki (BY border) | 307 |
| A7 | E67 | Rīga - Bauska - Grenctāle (LT border) | 85 |
| A8 | E77 | Rīga - Jelgava - Meitene (LT border) | 76 |
| A9 | | Rīga - Skulte - Liepāja | 199 |
| A10 | E22 | Rīga - Ventspils | 190 |
| A11 | | Liepāja - Rucava (LT border) | 57 |
| A12 | E22 E262 | Jēkabpils - Rēzekne - Ludza - Terehova (RU border) | 166 |
| A13 | E262 | Grebņeva (RU border) - Rēzekne - Daugavpils - Medumi (LT border) | 163 |
| A14 | E262 | Daugavpils ring road (Tilti - Kalkūne) | 15 |
| A15 | E262 | Rēzekne ring road | 7 |

=== Length of the road system ===
| Roads | Paved, km | Unpaved, km | Total, km |
| State-owned roads | | | |
|---|---|---|---|
| Highways (A) | 1651.1 | - | 1651.1 |
| Regional roads (P) | 4189.9 | 1127.5 | 5317.4 |
| Local roads (V) | 2616.7 | 10533.4 | 13150.1 |
| Municipality-owned roads | | | |
| Roads | 1055.6 | 29593.5 | 30649.1 |
| Streets | 4588.2 | 3446.4 | 8034.6 |
| Other roads | | | |
| Forest roads | - | 10142 | 10142 |
| Private house roads | 500 | 3000 | 3500 |
| Total | 14601.5 | 57842.8 | 72444.3 |

== Railways ==
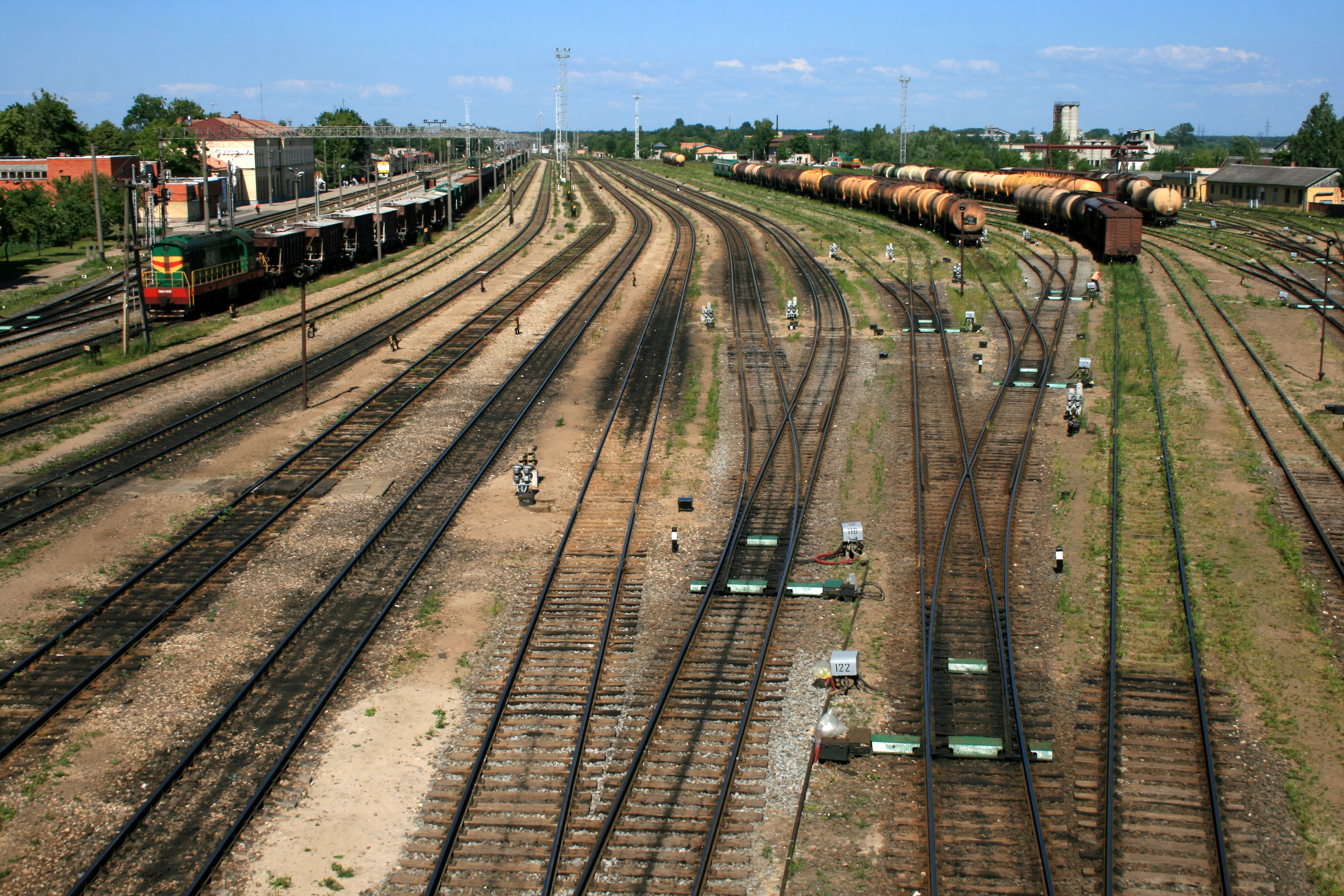
Jelgava railway station

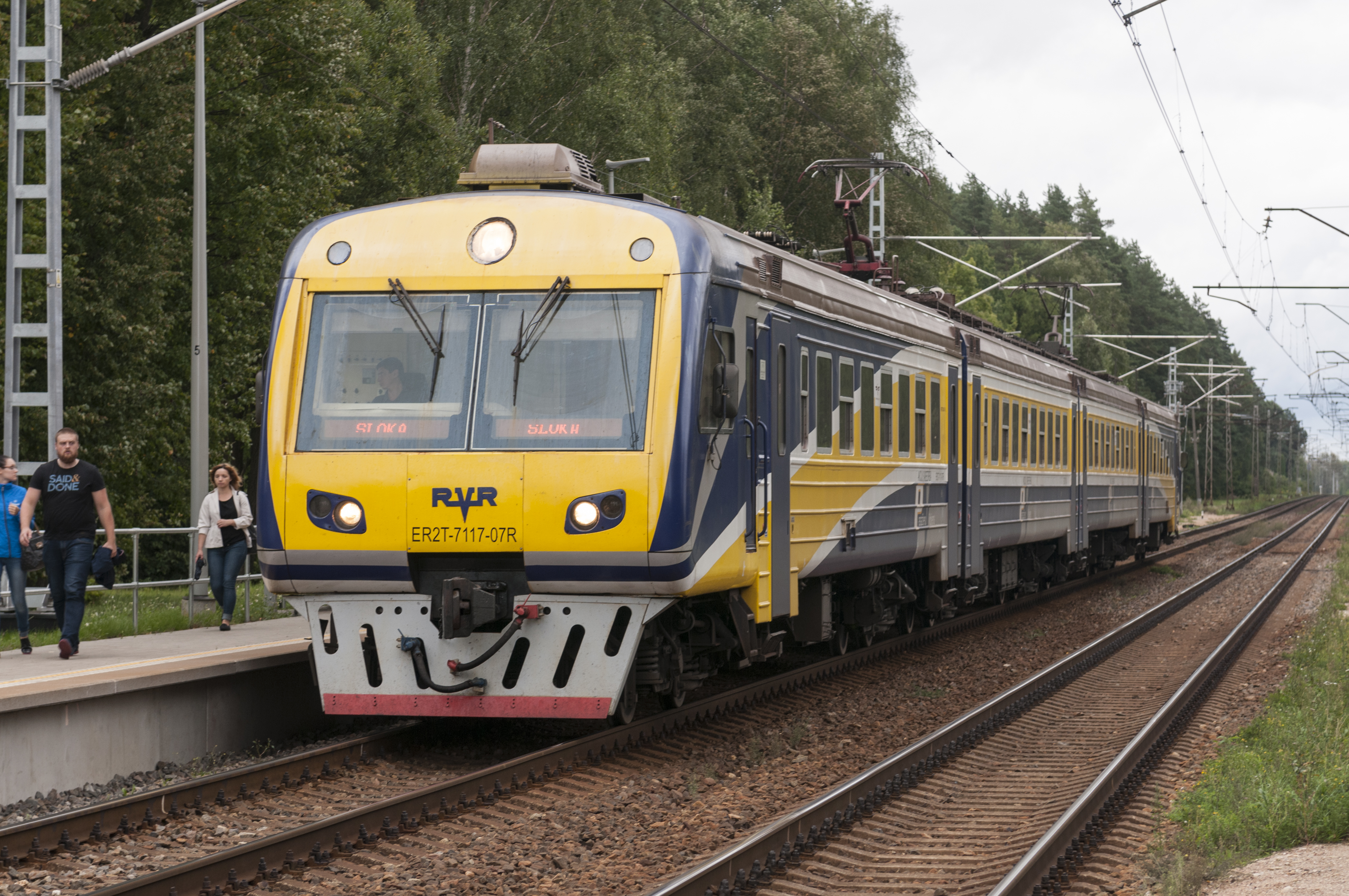
One of RVR ER2T trainsets operated by Pasažieru Vilciens

Latvian Railways is the main state-owned railway company in Latvia. It's daughter companies both carry out passengers services as well as carry a large quantity of freight cargo, and freight trains operate over the whole current passenger network, and a number of lines currently closed to passenger services.

There is also a narrow-gauge railway between Gulbene and Aluksne, operated by the Industrial Heritage Trust, using Russian and Polish built heritage rolling stock. Three narrow gauge trains a day operate on the 33 km route between the two towns.

total: 2,347 km
Russian gauge: 2,314 km 1,520 mm (4 ft 11 27/32 in) gauge (270 km electrified)
narrow gauge: 33 km 750 mm (2 ft 5 1/2 in) gauge (2002)

=== Passenger rail ===
Vivi is the only passenger-carrying operator in Latvia.

Domestic passenger lines with current service are:

- Torņakalns – Tukums II Railway
- Riga – Jelgava Railway
- Jelgava – Liepāja Railway
- Riga – Daugavpils Railway
- Krustpils – Rēzekne – Zilupe (border of Russia)
- Rīga – Sigulda – Cēsis – Valmiera – Valga (border of Estonia)
- Zemitāni – Skulte Railway
- Pļaviņas – Gulbene

=== Rail links with adjacent countries ===
- Russia - yes
- Lithuania - yes
- Belarus - yes
- Estonia - yes

== Airports ==
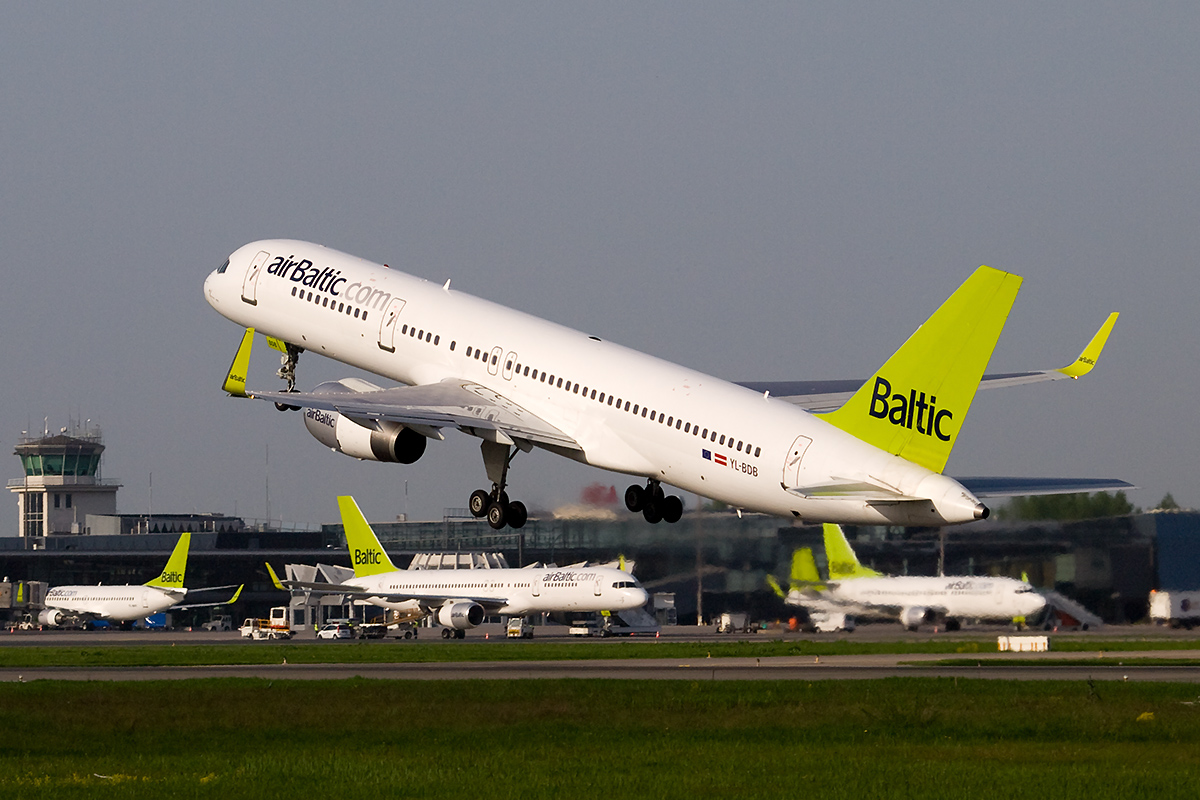
airBaltic Boeing 757−200WL take-off at Riga International Airport

Riga International Airport is the only major airport in Latvia, carrying around 5 million passengers annually. It is the largest airport in the Baltic states and has direct flights to over 80 destinations in 30 countries. It is also the main hub of airBaltic.

In the recent years airBaltic also operated from Liepāja International Airport as well as Ventspils International Airport but operations in both of these airports were ceased until 2017, when airBaltic relaunched flights from Riga to Liepaja.

Currently there are plans for further development in several regional airports, including Jūrmala Airport, Liepāja, Ventspils as well as Daugavpils International Airport.

=== Airfields ===
As of 2003, there were a total of 51 airfields in Latvia, with 27 of them having paved runways.

Airports - with paved runways total: 27
2,438 to 3,047 m: 7
1,524 to 2,437 m: 2
914 to 1,523 m: 2
under 914 m: 16 (2003)

Airports - with unpaved runways total: 24
2,438 to 3,047 m: 1
1,523 to 2,438 m: 2
914 to 1,523 m: 1
under 914 m: 20 (2003)

== Ports and harbors ==
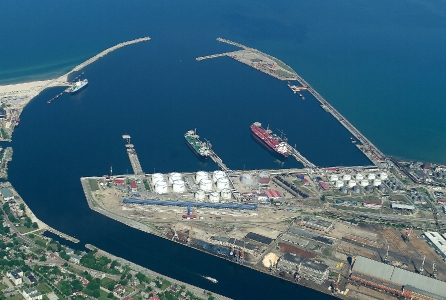
Port of Ventspils is the busiest port in the Baltic states

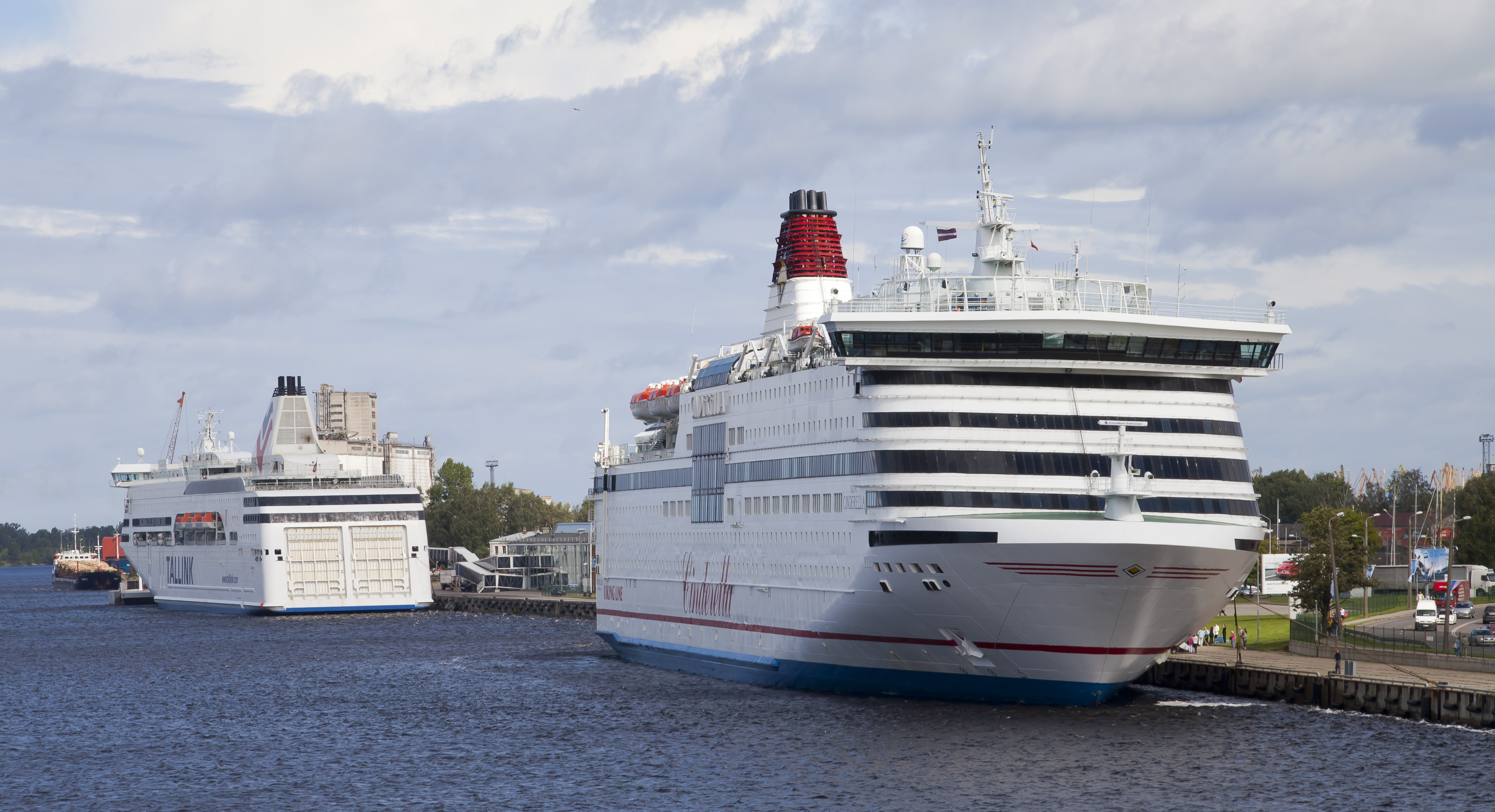
Riga Passenger Terminal

Key ports are located in Riga (Freeport of Riga and Riga Passenger Terminal), Ventspils (Free port of Ventspils), and Liepāja (Port of Liepāja). Most transit traffic uses these and half the cargo is crude oil and oil products.

== Waterways ==
300 km (perennially navigable)

== Pipelines ==
Crude oil 412 km; refined products 421 km; natural gas 1,097 km (2003)

== Merchant marine ==
Total: 11 ships (with a volume of 1,000 gross tonnage (GT) or over) totaling 53,153 GT/37,414 tonnes deadweight (DWT)
note: includes some foreign-owned ships registered here as a flag of convenience: Germany 1, Greece 1, Ukraine 1 (2002 est.)
ships by type: cargo ship 6, petroleum tanker 1, refrigerated cargo 2, roll-on/roll-off ship 1, short-sea/passenger 1
