= A9 road (Latvia) =

Road in Latvia

Coordinates: 56.688456°N 22.503638°E

A9

Route information
- Length: 199.3 km (123.8 mi)

Major junctions
- From: A 5 near Piņķi
- P 99 near Tīreļi P 101 near Tīreļi; P 98 near Grauzde; P 97 near Annenieki P 104 near Biksti P 109 near Brocēni P 105 near Saldus P 108 near Saldus P 107 near Skrunda P 116 near Skrunda P 117 near Skrunda P 115 near Kalvene P 112 near Grobiņa P 111 near Grobiņa P 113 near Grobiņa P 110 near Liepāja
- To: Liepāja / A 11

Location
- Country: Latvia
- Major cities: Brocēni, Saldus, Skrunda, Durbe, Grobiņa, Liepāja

Highway system
- National Roads in Latvia
| ← A 8 | → A 10 |

The A9 is a main national road in Latvia. It is officially named Rīga (Skulte)–Liepāja and forms the main road connection between the Riga area and Liepāja in western Latvia. The road is commonly known as the Liepāja Highway (Liepājas šoseja). It has a total length of 199.3 km (123.8 mi), of which 183.9 km (114.3 mi) are state-owned and 15.4 km (9.6 mi) are municipal-owned road sections.

The A9 is part of Latvia's TEN-T road network. In Liepāja, it connects with the A11, which continues south toward the Lithuanian border at Rucava.

== Route description ==
The A9 starts at the A5 Riga bypass near Piņķi, west of Riga, and runs west and south-west through Zemgale and Kurzeme toward the Baltic Sea coast. The road passes near or through Tīreļi, Annenieki, Biksti, Blīdene, Brocēni, Saldus, Skrunda, Kalvene, Durbe and Grobiņa before entering Liepāja.

Most of the A9 is a single-carriageway road with one lane in each direction. Local widening, turning lanes and traffic-management features are present at some junctions and in built-up sections. The road is paved with asphalt concrete along its full length. Outside built-up areas, the ordinary maximum speed limit is generally 90 km/h (56 mph), unless otherwise signed.

According to the official route list, the A9 includes municipal road sections in Brocēni, Skrunda, Grobiņa and Liepāja. In Brocēni the route follows Rīgas iela, in Skrunda it follows Ventas iela and Liepājas iela, in Grobiņa it follows Rīgas iela, and in Liepāja it follows Brīvības iela, Pulvera iela, Oskara Kalpaka iela and Brīvostas iela.

== History and reconstruction ==
Several large sections of the A9 were reconstructed during the 2014–2020 Cohesion Fund planning period. Projects included the reconstruction of the A9 between km 24.40 and 38.18, including the bridge over the Lielupe; the reconstruction of km 38.24–60.15, including bridges over the Apšupe, Bērzupīte and Bērze; the reconstruction of km 163.28–185.80; and works on the Saldus-area sections km 97.58–99.74 and km 102.92–113.13, including the bridge over the Ciecere and the Bukupes culvert.

In 2014, a 15 km (9.3 mi) section near Kalvene, between km 148 and 163, was opened after reconstruction. The works included recycling the old pavement, laying three asphalt layers, reconstructing the bridge over the Stulbe River, and improving bus stops and pavilions. Latvijas Valsts ceļi reported the cost of the project at about €8 million.

In 2021, reconstruction was completed on the section near Saldus, from the Priede filling station to the border of Saldus parish, km 99.74–102.92. The project included pavement reconstruction, the Saldus roundabout, traffic-safety equipment, lighting, and a pedestrian and cycling route around the roundabout. The cost was reported as €5.8 million, including VAT.

=== Long-term upgrade proposals near Riga ===
A larger reconstruction of the A9 between the A5 Riga bypass and the P98 junction near Tušķi, km 0.0–38.2, was assessed in an environmental impact assessment process started in 2010 and completed in 2012. The overall project considered reconstruction of the existing two-lane A9 section into a four-lane general-use road, mainly within the existing road land corridor, while also assessing possible improvements outside that corridor in some places.

The first alternative, intended for the period up to 2035, retained a two-lane road but envisaged reconstruction to the NP14 profile, elimination of direct private-property accesses, connection of properties to a new parallel-road network, and construction of five grade-separated junctions. The proposed junction locations were the A9/A5 junction, km 2.3 for the V11 Dzilnuciems–Piņķi road, km 23.5 for the P99 Jelgava–Kalnciems road, km 25.5 for the P101 Kalnciems–Kūdra road, and km 38.2 for the P98 Jelgava (Tušķi)–Tukums road.

The same assessment also considered a later alternative for the period after 2035, under which the section would be widened to four lanes with the NP21 profile. The later alternative provided for almost all remaining at-grade connections to be converted into grade-separated junctions, while the layout of the first alternative was planned so as not to preclude later widening. The environmental assessment stated that the first alternative was not planned for implementation in the planning periods up to 2014 or up to 2020; therefore, earlier statements that all at-grade junctions on the Riga-area A9 would be removed around 2020 are outdated.

== Current and planned works ==
In May 2026, Latvijas Valsts ceļi started safety-improvement works on the beginning of the A9 from Brīvkalni to Klīves, km 0.00–9.90. The project redesigns 31 access points to the road: 18 direct connections are being closed or connected to new parallel roads, 11 accesses are being equipped with additional lanes, and two accesses are being rebuilt for right turns only.

The same project includes new parallel roads and lighting near Dzilnuciems and Klīves, pedestrian and cycling infrastructure from the Sēbruciems junction to Skārduciems, sidewalks near the Skārduciems and Lapsu bus stops, asphalt resurfacing, bus-stop improvements and renewal of the Dzilnupe culvert. The contract value is €6.5 million, including VAT, with 85% financed from European Union funds and 15% from the Latvian state budget.

In 2026, LVC also planned asphalt pavement renewal on the A9 near Blīdene over a section of more than 8 km (5.0 mi).

== Traffic and enforcement ==
Latvijas Valsts ceļi publishes traffic-intensity data for state roads as the average number of vehicles per day. In the 2025 dataset, the unweighted average of the listed A9 section values was 7,310 vehicles per day. The listed section values ranged from 3,552 vehicles per day to 14,738 vehicles per day.

Average-speed enforcement has been introduced on several A9 sections. On 25 February 2026, average-speed-control systems began operating from the 10th kilometre to Kaģi, km 9.9–23.1, and from Blīdene to Brocēni, km 80.0–93.6. On 26 March 2026, another average-speed-control section began operating between Apšupe and Tiltiņi, km 39.1–56.7. The systems also check compulsory vehicle insurance, technical inspection status and road-user-charge compliance.

== Major intersections ==
| Road | Location or connection |
|---|---|
| A 5 | Riga bypass near Piņķi |
| P 99 | near Tīreļi |
| P 101 | near Tīreļi |
| P 98 | connection toward Jelgava and Tukums |
| P 97 | near Annenieki |
| P 104 | near Biksti |
| P 109 | Brocēni |
| P 105 | Saldus |
| P 108 | Saldus |
| P 107 | Skrunda |
| P 116 | near Skrunda |
| P 117 | near Skrunda |
| P 115 | near Kalvene |
| P 112 | near Grobiņa |
| P 111 | near Grobiņa |
| P 113 | near Grobiņa |
| P 110 | near Liepāja |
| A 11 | Liepāja; continuation toward Rucava and the Lithuanian border |

== Settlements on or near the route ==
- Tīreļi
- Annenieki
- Biksti
- Blīdene
- Brocēni
- Saldus
- Skrunda
- Kalvene
- Durbe
- Grobiņa
- Liepāja

== See also ==
- Transport in Latvia
- List of National Roads in Latvia
- A11 road (Latvia)
