= A11 road (Latvia) =

Road in Latvia

A11
- Klaipēdas šoseja

Route information
- Length: 58.9 km (36.6 mi)

Major junctions
- North end: Liepāja / A 9
- P 110 in Liepāja P 113 near Rucava
- South end: Lithuania border near Rucava; A 13 A13

Location
- Country: Latvia
- Major cities: Liepāja

Highway system
- National Roads in Latvia
← A 10	→ A 12

The A11 is a main national road in Latvia. It is officially named Liepāja–Lietuvas robeža (Rucava) and connects Liepāja with the Lithuanian border near Rucava. The road is also commonly known as the Klaipėda Highway (Klaipēdas šoseja). It has a total length of 58.9 km (36.6 mi), of which 48.5 km (30.1 mi) are state-owned and 10.4 km (6.5 mi) are municipal-owned road sections.

The A11 is part of Latvia's TEN-T comprehensive road network. At the Lithuanian border, the road continues toward Palanga and Klaipėda as the Lithuanian A13.

== Route description ==
The A11 starts in Liepāja, where it continues south from the A9. According to the official route list, the municipal section of the A11 in Liepāja follows Brīvības iela (Zemnieku iela), Parka iela, Jaunais tilts, Ganību iela (Zirņu iela) and Klaipēdas iela. South of Liepāja, the road runs through or near Bernāti, Nīca and Rucava before reaching the Lithuanian border.

Most of the A11 is a single-carriageway road with one lane in each direction. The route is paved with asphalt concrete along its full length. Outside Liepāja, the road serves the coastal part of Dienvidkurzeme Municipality and provides Latvia's main road connection from Liepāja toward Palanga and Klaipėda.

== History and reconstruction ==
Before the major reconstruction works of the 2010s, parts of the Klaipēda Highway were in poor condition. In 2016, Latvijas Valsts ceļi reported that the road from Liepāja to Rucava had last undergone major repairs around 30 years earlier, and that residents of Liepāja, Rucava and Nīca had collected more than 1,000 signatures about the poor state of the road.

During the 2014–2020 Cohesion Fund planning period, a major A11 reconstruction project was carried out between km 21.85 and 45.02. The project rebuilt 23.17 km (14.40 mi) of pavement and the bridges over the Līgupe and Paurupe in order to increase pavement bearing capacity. The works started on 2 June 2015, were completed on 30 August 2016 and the object was put into operation on 30 December 2016. The eligible project cost was €14.25 million, including €12.11 million from the Cohesion Fund.

In September 2016, LVC officially opened the reconstructed Nīca–Rucava section of the A11, described in the opening report as km 27.32–50.49. The reconstruction was described as important for local residents, tourism, access to coastal areas and freight traffic from the direction of Klaipėda and Palanga.

In 2018, resurfacing works were completed on the Liepāja–Nīca section, km 10.42–27.37. The works included asphalt levelling milling, a binder course and surface course, renewal of the bridge over the Tosele, renewal of 21 bus stops and horizontal road markings. The contract value was €3.5 million, including VAT, and the works were financed from the Latvian state budget.

A further reconstruction project was carried out near the Lithuanian border between km 50.547 and 58.997. The 8.45 km (5.25 mi) project started on 26 June 2017, was completed on 23 August 2018 and was put into operation on 18 March 2019. The eligible project cost was €3.92 million, including €3.33 million from the Cohesion Fund. The works included recycling the old asphalt pavement, building a frost-resistant layer and crushed-stone base, laying two layers of hot asphalt, and constructing 10 new bus stops.

== Recent improvements ==
In 2024, a separated pedestrian and cycling path was built along the A11 from the Liepāja administrative boundary to Bernāti, km 10.42–20.09. The project provided a 2.5 m (8.2 ft) wide asphalt-concrete combined pedestrian and cycling path on the right side of the road. The approximately 10 km (6.2 mi) route was opened on 20 September 2024 after about five months of construction. The project also included the rebuilding or construction of 53 asphalt accesses to properties.

In May 2025, Latvijas Valsts ceļi announced pavement-renewal works on the Rucava–Lithuanian border section, km 50.47–58.93, with completion planned for mid-August 2025. The works included levelling milling, local asphalt repairs, new binder and wearing courses, renewal of signs and road equipment, horizontal markings, and an acoustic rumble strip in the wearing course. The contract value was €2.06 million, including VAT.

== Traffic ==
Latvijas Valsts ceļi publishes traffic-intensity statistics for state roads as average vehicles per day. In the 2025 dataset, the listed A11 state-road sections carried 5,147 vehicles per day between km 10.428 and 30.104, 2,192 vehicles per day between km 30.104 and 47.077, and 1,806 vehicles per day between km 47.077 and 58.938.

== Major intersections ==
Road	Location or connection
A 9	Liepāja; continuation toward Riga
P 110	Liepāja; connection toward Tāši
P 113	near Rucava; connection toward Bārta and Grobiņa
A 13	Lithuanian border; continuation toward Palanga and Klaipėda

== Settlements on or near the route ==
- Liepāja
- Bernāti
- Nīca
- Rucava

== See also ==
- Transport in Latvia
- List of National Roads in Latvia
- A9 road (Latvia)
- A13 highway (Lithuania)
