= A10 road (Latvia) =

Road in Latvia

Coordinates: 57.106635°N 22.775594°E

A10
- Ventspils šoseja

Route information
- Part of E22
- Length: 190.1 km (118.1 mi)

Major junctions
- East end: Riga
- A 5 near Babīte P 133 near Riga International Airport P 101 near Ķemeri; P 98 near Tukums P 130 near Kandava P 120 near Talsi P 123 near Ugāle P 124 near Pope P 122 in Ventspils
- West end: Ventspils

Location
- Country: Latvia
- Major cities: Riga, Jūrmala, Tukums, Ventspils

Highway system
- National Roads in Latvia
← A 9	→ A 11

The A10 is a main national road in Latvia. It is officially named Rīga–Ventspils and connects Riga with Jūrmala, Tukums and Ventspils. The road is commonly known as the Ventspils Highway (Ventspils šoseja), while the high-capacity section between Riga and Jūrmala is also commonly known as the Jūrmala Highway (Jūrmalas šoseja). The road has a total length of 190.1 km (118.1 mi), of which 168.9 km (104.9 mi) are state-owned road sections, 15.6 km (9.7 mi) are municipal-owned road sections, and 5.6 km (3.5 mi) coincide with other national-road routes.

The A10 forms part of European route E22 and is included in Latvia's TEN-T road network. It is an important passenger and freight route, connecting Riga and the Riga metropolitan area with Jūrmala, western Kurzeme and the port of Ventspils.

== Route description ==
The A10 starts in Riga. According to the official route list, the Riga section includes coinciding sections with the A6, A7 and A8, and follows Kārļa Ulmaņa gatve. West of Riga, the road continues toward Babīte, where it intersects the Riga bypass, and then runs toward Jūrmala.

The Riga–Jūrmala section is the highest-capacity part of the route and has up to three lanes in each direction. West of the Jūrmala access section, the A10 continues mainly as a single-carriageway road with one lane in each direction. The route passes through or near Jūrmala, Ķemeri, Smārde, Tukums, Pūre, Kandava, Talsi, Spāre, Usma, Ugāle and Pope before entering Ventspils.

According to the official route list, the A10 includes municipal-owned sections in Riga, Jūrmala and Ventspils. In Jūrmala, the municipal section is listed as Jūrmalas apvedceļš. In Ventspils, the route follows Kurzemes iela, Embūtes iela, Dzintaru iela, Ventas tilts, Lielais prospekts, Sarkanmuižas dambis, Brīvības iela, Kuldīgas iela and Prāmju iela.

Outside built-up areas, the ordinary maximum speed limit is generally 90 km/h (56 mph), unless otherwise signed. In 2026, a seasonal maximum speed limit of up to 110 km/h (68 mph) was introduced on the Jūrmala Highway section of the A10 from Riga to Jūrmala.

== History ==
The Riga–Jūrmala section of the modern A10 follows an older transport corridor between Riga and the seaside resorts of Jūrmala. In 1877, the Riga–Tukums railway line was opened, while nearby roads mainly served as access roads. As the resorts of the Riga seaside became more important in the early 20th century, the road committee of the Courland Governorate built a 24 km (15 mi) road from Riga to Dubulti between 1905 and 1917, including a bridge over the Lielupe.

By 1925, the road from the Riga boundary to Lielupe had been rebuilt, and in 1926 a black surface treatment was applied over a 13 km (8.1 mi) section to improve access for seaside visitors. After World War II, several years were spent repairing war damage. In 1949, the first asphalt pavement on the corridor was laid near Babīte, using asphalt produced at the Bišumuiža asphalt-concrete plant.

Rising traffic volumes in the 1960s led to a major reconstruction of the Riga–Jūrmala road. The rebuilt Riga–Jūrmala highway was completed in 1972 as a first technical-category road with six traffic lanes over a 12.1 km (7.5 mi) section, grade-separated junctions, lighting and service areas. At the time, it was regarded as one of the most modern roads in Latvia and was informally known as "six minutes to the West" (sešas minūtes Rietumos).

== Reconstruction and improvements ==
In 2016, works began on two A10 sections near Jūrmala: renewal of the section from Varkaļi to the Jūrmala highway exit, km 20.06–23.84, and reconstruction of the bridge over the Lielupe and adjoining road section, km 36.49–38.57. The works were carried out by AS A.C.B. under a contract worth €11.0 million, including VAT.

Also in 2016, roadworks started near Tukums. The section from the Smārde and Slampe turn-off to Ozolpils, km 52.74–57.76, was resurfaced, while the following section, km 57.76–68.60, was rebuilt and a roundabout was constructed at the junction with the regional road Jelgava (Tušķi)–Tukums. The P98 junction had been identified as a traffic black spot.

In 2017, reconstruction was completed at the A10 junction with the P130 Līgas–Kandava–Veģi road and the local road Līgas–Zentene–Rideļi near Kandava. The project changed the geometry of the wide junction to reduce vehicle speeds and improve visibility, relocated a bus stop, installed lighting and built sidewalks for pedestrians. The project cost was about €0.5 million, including VAT.

In 2019–2020, the Jūrmala Highway section of the A10 from the Riga boundary to the approaches to the Jūrmala access-control point, km 13.41–19.25, was rebuilt. Latvijas Valsts ceļi described it as the road section with the highest traffic intensity in Latvia; in 2019, traffic intensity there reached 48,540 vehicles per day. The works started in June 2019 and were carried out by a supplier association of A.C.B. and Binders for €22.97 million, including VAT, financed from the Latvian state budget.

In 2022, full reconstruction works were carried out on the A10 between Kūdra and the turn-off to Smārde, km 41.30–52.74. The works included removing weak peat layers where necessary, replacing them with suitable soil, building drainage and frost-resistant layers, reconstructing culverts and road embankments, and laying three asphalt layers. During the same construction season, pavement renewal was also carried out between Usma and the bridge over the Tirukšupe, km 136.41–139.51, and in Pope parish between Ūdensvada ceļš and the Valdemārpils–Pope road, km 164.36–165.60.

In 2024, pavement renewal works started on a 20 km (12 mi) section near Ugāle, from the turn-off to Ugāles dzirnavas to Ūdensvada ceļš, km 145.47–164.36. The works included resurfacing, renewal of the bridges over the Engure and Svēte rivers, drainage improvements, culvert works, renewal of bus-stop platforms and road equipment, and installation of acoustic rumble strips outside the section through Ugāle.

== Traffic and enforcement ==
Latvijas Valsts ceļi publishes traffic-intensity statistics for state roads as the average number of vehicles per day. Traffic volumes are highest on the Riga–Jūrmala section and decline west of Jūrmala and Tukums toward Ventspils. The road also carries significant seasonal passenger traffic toward Jūrmala and the Kurzeme coast, as well as freight traffic toward Ventspils. In the 2025 dataset, the unweighted average of the listed A10 section values was 11,816 vehicles per day.

Average-speed enforcement has been introduced on several A10 sections. On 3 October 2023, an average-speed-control section began operating from Gulbju ezers to the turn-off to Usma, km 135.0–140.8. On 22 November 2023, another section began operating from Varkaļi to Spuņciems, km 24.1–30.8. On 29 November 2023, a third section began operating between the turn-off to Tīreļu taka and the turn-off to Smārde, km 44.9–52.4. The systems also check compulsory vehicle insurance, technical inspection status and road-user-charge compliance.

== Major intersections ==
Road	Location or connection
A 6 / A 7 / A 8	Riga; coinciding urban sections
A 5	near Babīte; connection with the Riga bypass
P 133	connection toward Riga International Airport
P 101	near Ķemeri
P 98	near Tukums; connection toward Jelgava
P 121	near Tukums
P 130	near Kandava
P 120	near Talsi
P 123	near Ugāle
P 124	near Pope
P 122	Ventspils

== Settlements on or near the route ==
- Riga
- Babīte
- Jūrmala
- Ķemeri
- Smārde
- Tukums
- Pūre
- Kandava
- Talsi
- Spāre
- Usma
- Ugāle
- Pope
- Ventspils

== See also ==
- Transport in Latvia
- List of National Roads in Latvia
- European route E22
- Free port of Ventspils
