= European route E22 =

Road in trans-European E-road network

E22

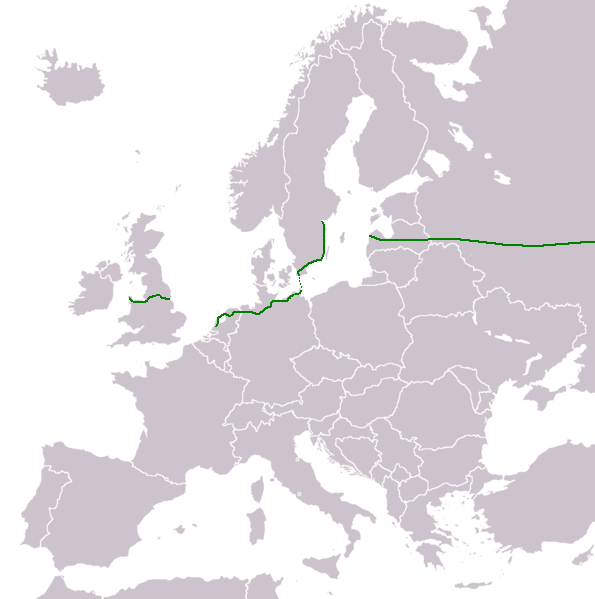

Route information
- Length: 5,320 km (3,310 mi)

Major junctions
- West end: Holyhead, United Kingdom
- E5 / E20 in Warrington, United Kingdom; E15 in Pontefract, United Kingdom; E20 in Goole, United Kingdom; E19 / E35 in Amsterdam, Netherlands; E26 / E45 in Hamburg, Germany; E6 / E20 / E65 in Malmö, Sweden; E4 in Norrköping, Sweden; E95 in Pustoshka, Russia; E30 in Ishim, Russia
- East end: Ishim, Russia

Location
- Countries: United Kingdom, Netherlands, Germany, Sweden, Latvia, Russia

Highway system
- International E-road network; A Class; B Class
← E21	→ E23

European route E22 is one of the longest European routes. It has a length of about 5,320 km (3,310 mi). Many of the E-roads have been extended into Asia since the year 2000; the E22 was extended on 24 June 2002.

== Route ==
E22 route summary
(United Kingdom)	A55 → A494 → M56 → M6 → M62 → M60 → M62 → M18 → M180 → A180 → A160; View at OpenStreetMap
(Netherlands)	A 10 → A 8 → A 7 → N 7 → A 7 → N 7 → A 7 View at OpenStreetMap
(Germany)	A 280 → A 31 → A 28 → A 1 → A 20 → B 96; View at OpenStreetMap
(Sweden)	E6/E22 → E6/E20/E22 → E22; View at OpenStreetMap
(Latvia)	A 10 → A 8/A 10 → A 7/A 8/A 10 → A 6 → A 4 → P 5 → P 80 → A 6 → A 12; View at OpenStreetMap
(Russia)	M 9 → МКАД → M 7 View at OpenStreetMap
(Russia)	M 12 → M 7 → P 242 → ЕКАД → P 351 → P 402; View at OpenStreetMap

=== United Kingdom ===
Port of Holyhead (53.3094°N 4.6289°W)

- A55: Holyhead → Ewloe
  - Ewloe Interchange (53.18752°N 3.06427°W)
- A494: Hawarden → Shotton
  - Dunkirk Roundabout (53.24527°N 2.93714°W)
- M56: Ellesmere Port → Runcorn → Warrington
  - Lymm Interchange (53.3525°N 2.5029°W)
- M6: Warrington
  (Concurrency with E5)
  - Croft Interchange (53.426°N 2.5561°W)
    (Start of concurrency with E20)
- M62: Warrington → Irlam
  - Eccles Interchange (53.48761°N 2.37666°W)
- M60: Salford → Manchester
  - Simister Island (53.54978°N 2.26054°W)
- M62: Rochdale → Huddersfield → Leeds → Normanton → Castleford → Pontefract
  ( E15 / A1(M): Pontefract (53.711174°N 1.290832°W))
  - Langham Interchange (53.6844°N 0.9693°W)
    (End of concurrency with E20)
- M18
  - North Ings Interchange (53.5915°N 0.9872°W)
- M180: Scunthorpe
  - Barnetby Top (53.58556°N 0.41392°W)
- A180
  - Brocklesby Interchange (53.61415°N 0.28289°W)
- A160

Port of Immingham (53.62718°N 0.19097°W)

=== Netherlands ===
Amsterdam (52°22′N 4°54′E)

  - Knooppunt De Nieuwe Meer (52.33867°N 4.84153°E)
    ( E19 / A 4 / A 10)
- A 10: Amsterdam
  - Coenplein (52.4231°N 4.876°E)
    ( E35 / A 10)
- A 8
  - Knooppunt Zaandam (52.4556°N 4.8415°E)
- A 7: Zaanstad → Purmerend → Hoorn
  - Folsgare (53.04109°N 5.61029°E)
- N 7: Sneek
  - Sneek (53.017°N 5.6842°E)
- A 7: Heerenveen → Drachten → Leek
  - Groningen-West (53.1966°N 6.5403°E)
- N 7: Groningen
  ( E232 / A 28 (53.20325°N 6.56469°E))
  - Westerbroek (53.20416°N 6.63233°E)
- A 7: Hoogezand → Winschoten

Bad Nieuweschans (53°10′50″N 7°12′26″E)

=== Germany ===
Bunde (53°11′N 7°16′E)

- A 280
  - Dreieck Bunde (53.1628°N 7.2831°E)
- A 31: Leer
  - Dreieck Leer (53.267°N 7.497°E)
- A 28: Westerstede → Oldenburg → Delmenhorst
  - Dreieck Stuhr (53.00533°N 8.70239°E)
    ( E37 / A 1)
- A 1: Bremen → Hamburg → Lübeck
  ( E234 / A 27: Bremen (53.0421°N 8.9833°E))
  ( E45 / A 7: Hamburg (53.3771°N 10.0155°E))
  ( E26 / A 24: Hamburg (53.5616°N 10.1667°E))
  - Kreuz Lübeck (53.8501°N 10.5937°E)
    ( E47 / A 1)
- A 20: Lübeck → Wismar → Rostock
  - Stralsund (54.08632°N 13.1275°E)
- B 96: Stralsund → Bergen auf Rügen
  (Concurrency with E251)

Sassnitz (54°30′59″N 13°38′28″E)

==== Elbe Crossing ====
There are currently plans to reroute the E22 between Lübeck and Westerstede, to go north of Hamburg and Bremen over the A20, when this new motorway is built after 2020. The E22 would then use the planned tunnel under the Elbe at Drochtersen/Glückstadt.

=== Sweden ===
Trelleborg (55°22′N 13°10′E)

- E22: Trelleborg → Vellinge
  (Start of concurrency with E6)
  - Trafikplats Petersborg (55.5474°N 13.0023°E)
- E22: Malmö
  (Concurrency with E20)
  ( E65 (55.5602°N 13.0782°E))
  - Trafikplats Kronetorp (55.6411°N 13.1047°E)
    (End of concurrency with E6)
- E22: Lund → Kristianstad → Karlshamn → Ronneby → Karlskrona → Kalmar → Oskarshamn → Västervik → Norrköping
  - Trafikplats Norrköping Södra (58.5805°N 16.1122°E)
    ( E4)

Norrköping (58°36′N 16°12′E)

In Sweden, E-Roads do not have national numbers. There is currently no ferry across the Baltic Sea between Norrköping and Ventspils. The best ferry alternative is from Nynäshamn to Ventspils. The line is run by Scandlines.

=== Latvia ===
Ventspils (57°23′26″N 21°34′24″E)

- A 10: Ventspils → Tukums → Jūrmala → Riga
  - (56.91854°N 24.08826°E)
- A 8 / A 10: Riga
  - (56.92509°N 24.10758°E)
- A 7 / A 8 / A 10: Riga
  - (56.93777°N 24.12781°E)
- A 6: Riga → Salaspils
  ( Start of concurrency with E67 / E77: A 5, Salaspils (56.8586°N 24.3121°E))
  - (56.8464°N 24.3966°E)
- A 4: Salaspils
  - (56.90080°N 24.40652°E)
    (End of concurrency with E67 / E77)
- P 5
  - (56.85879°N 24.56469°E)
- P 80
  - (56.64158°N 25.44601°E)
- A 6: Pļaviņas → Jēkabpils
  - (56.50399°N 25.88984°E)
- A 12: Jēkabpils → Varakļāni → Viļāni → Rēzekne → Ludza → Zilupe

Zilupe (56°23′N 28°07′E)

=== Russia ===
Burachki (56.356°N 28.19383°E)

- M 9: Velikiye Luki → Nelidovo → Rzev → Volokolamsk → Krasnogorsk
  ( E95 / R 23: Pustoshka (56.3152°N 29.392°E))
  - (55.78968°N 37.37281°E)
    (Start of concurrency with E105)
- MKAD: Moscow
  ( End of concurrency with E105: M 10, Khimki (55.8816°N 37.4451°E))
  ( Start of concurrency with E115: M 8, Mytishchi (55.8823°N 37.7259°E))
  - (55.77692°N 37.84271°E)
    (End of concurrency with E115)
- M 7: Reutov → Balashikha → Noginsk → Sobinka → Vladimir → Vjazniki → Dzerzinsk → Nizhny Novgorod → Cheboksary → Kazan
  - (55.67488°N 49.70199°E)
- M 12: Yelabuga
  - (55.80422°N 52.1399°E)
    ( E017 / M 12)
- M 7: Mendeleyevsk → Agryz → Izhevsk → Igra → Krasnokamsk → Perm
  - (57.9329°N 56.2679°E)
- R 242: Perm → Kungur → Revda → Yekaterinburg
  - (56.8331°N 60.3209°E)
- ЕКАД: Yekaterinburg
  - (56.8033°N 60.7904°E)
- R 351: Yekaterinburg → Bogdanovich → Kamyshlov → Tyumen
  - (57.12983°N 65.48159°E)
- Tyumen
  - (56.9191°N 65.8332°E)
- R 402: Zavodoukovsk → Ishim
  - (56.1522°N 69.4773°E)
    ( E30 / R 254)

Ishim (56°07′N 69°30′E)

Between Kazan and Igra, the road takes a detour over Yelabuga, because the shortest route between Kazan and Igra uses a ferry over the Vyatka River (56.592°N 50.709°E), and the road is a bad gravel road around that area. Google Maps shows the E22 to use the ferry, but that is inaccurate; the UN convention lists Yelabuga along a paved road without any ferry. Both routes are visible in Google Streetview. A much used shortcut is Izhevsk - Votkinsk - Perm.

Between Perm and Ishim, the E22 follows the Trans-Siberian Railway.

== Gallery ==
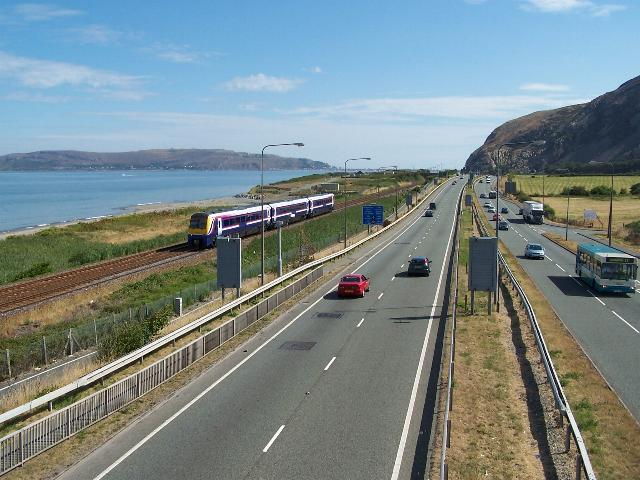
E22/ at Penmaenmawr, North Wales, UK.

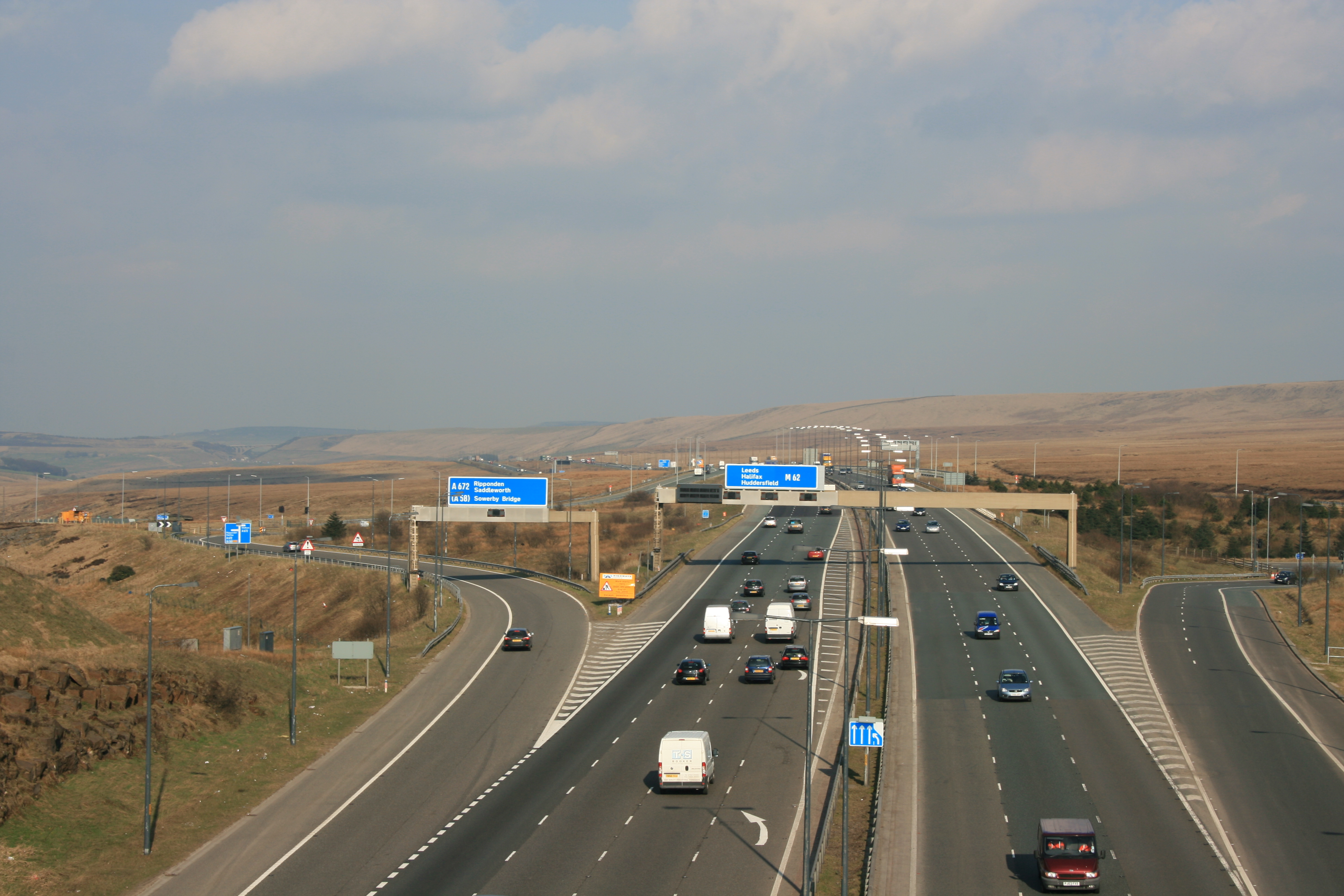
E22/ at junction 22, the highest point on the English motorway network, West Yorkshire, UK

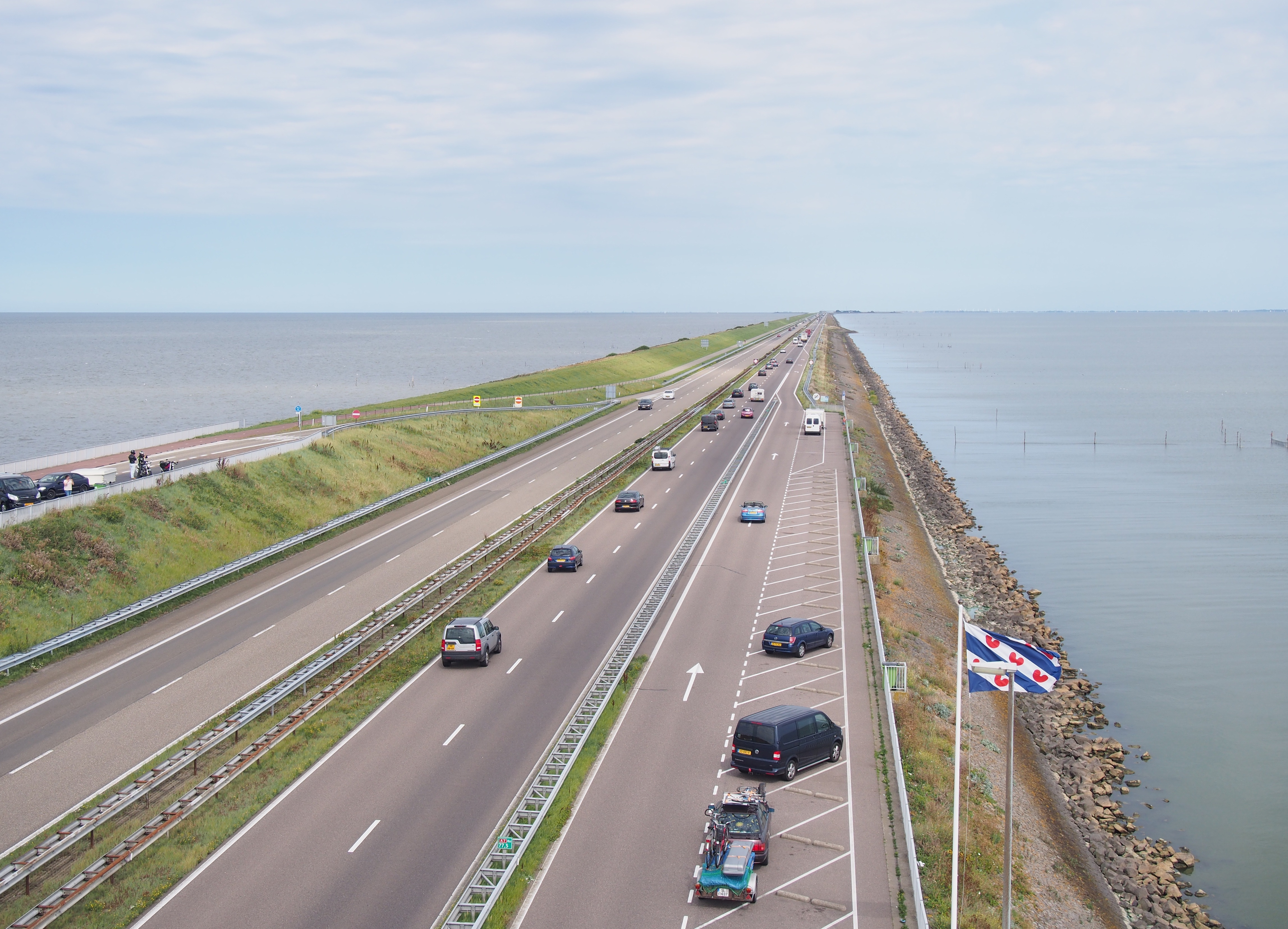
E22 over Afsluitdijk in Netherlands

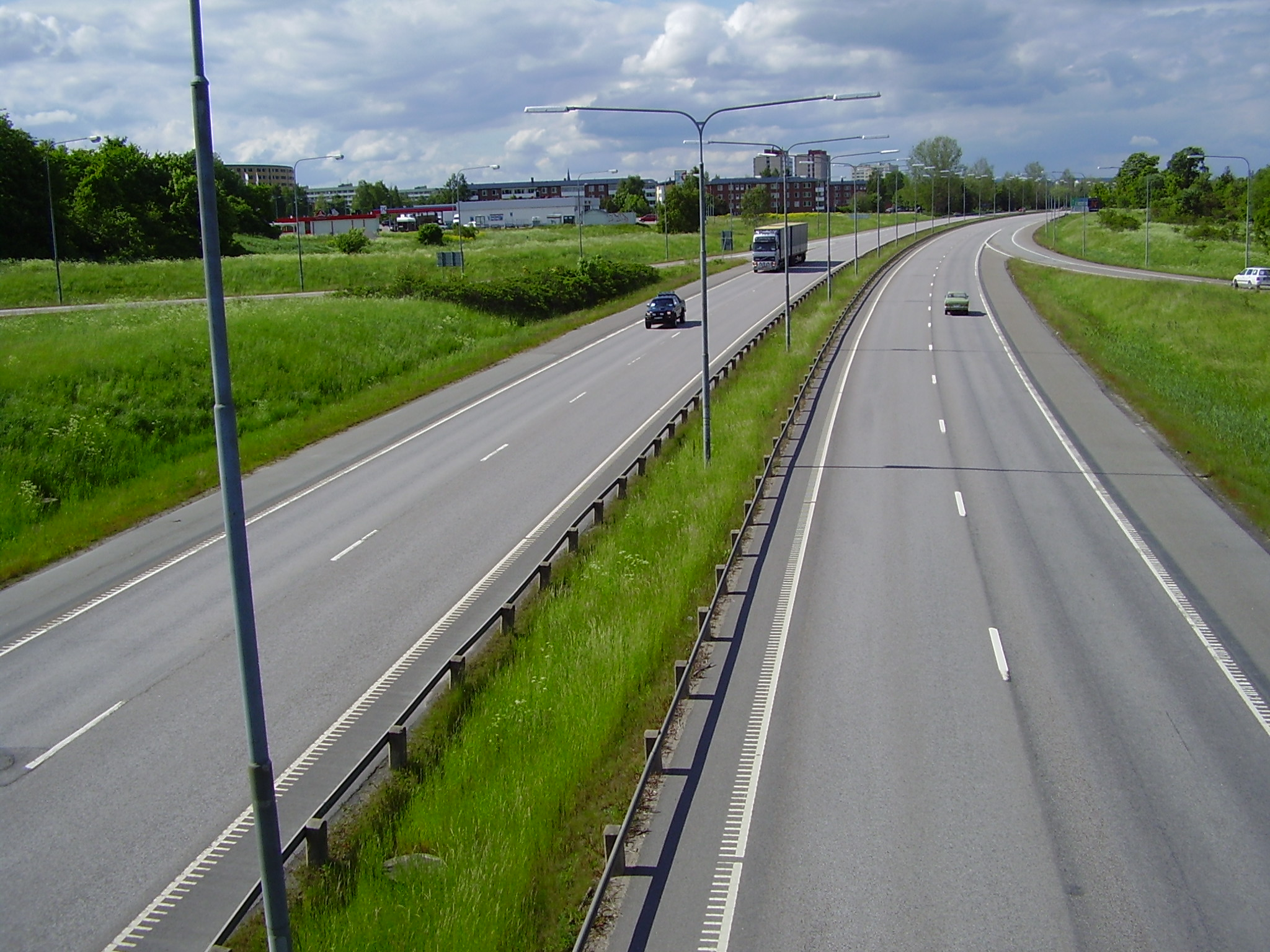
E22 at Norrköping, Sweden

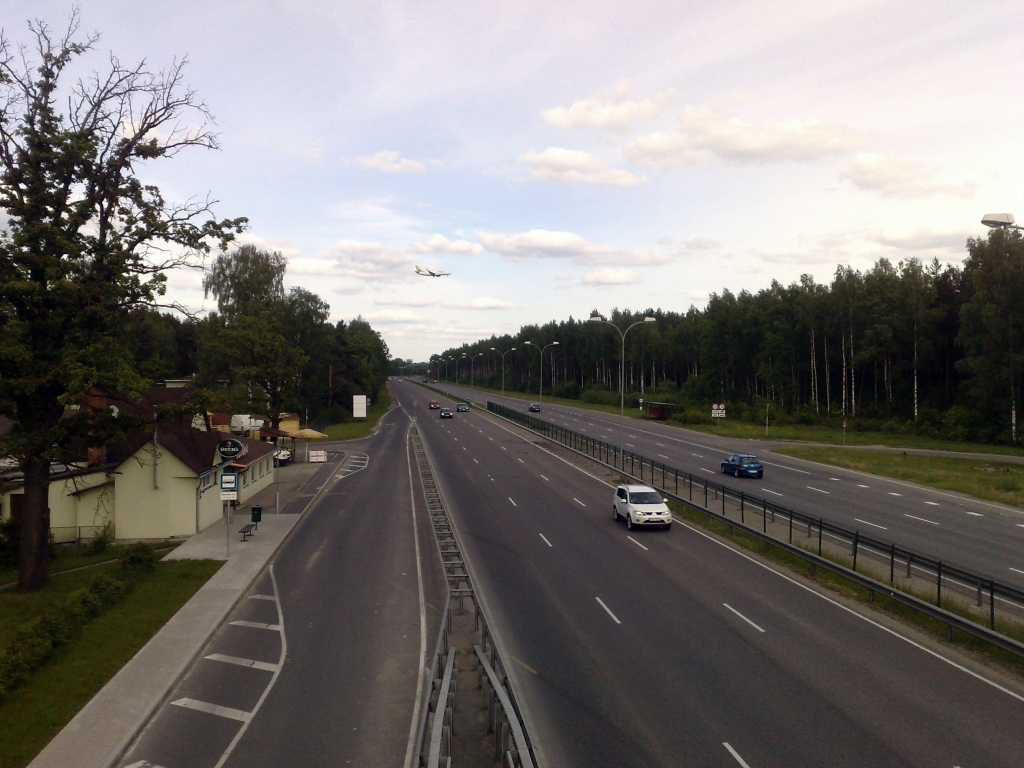
E22 near Riga, Latvia

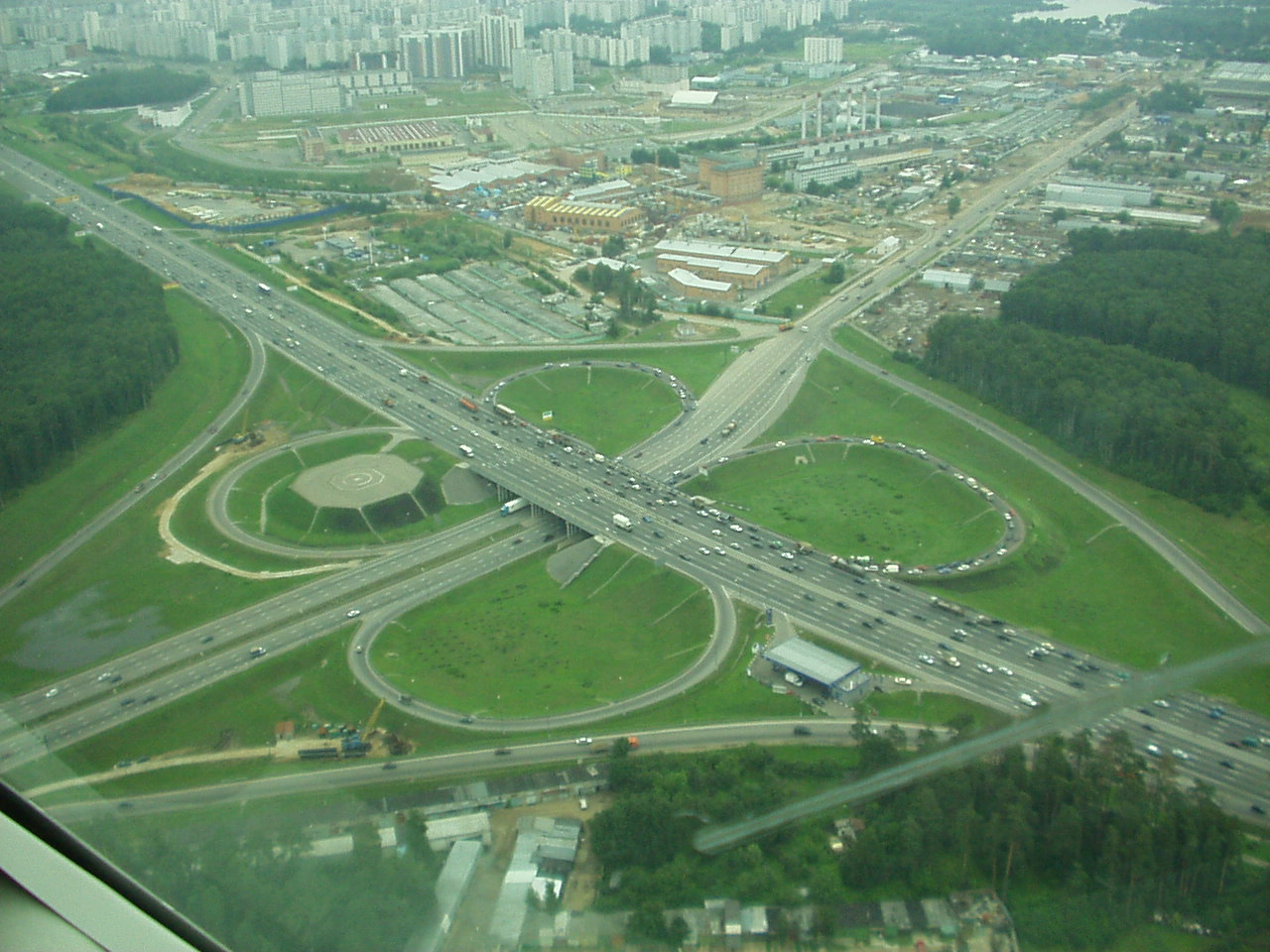
E22/ M 9 begins in Moscow

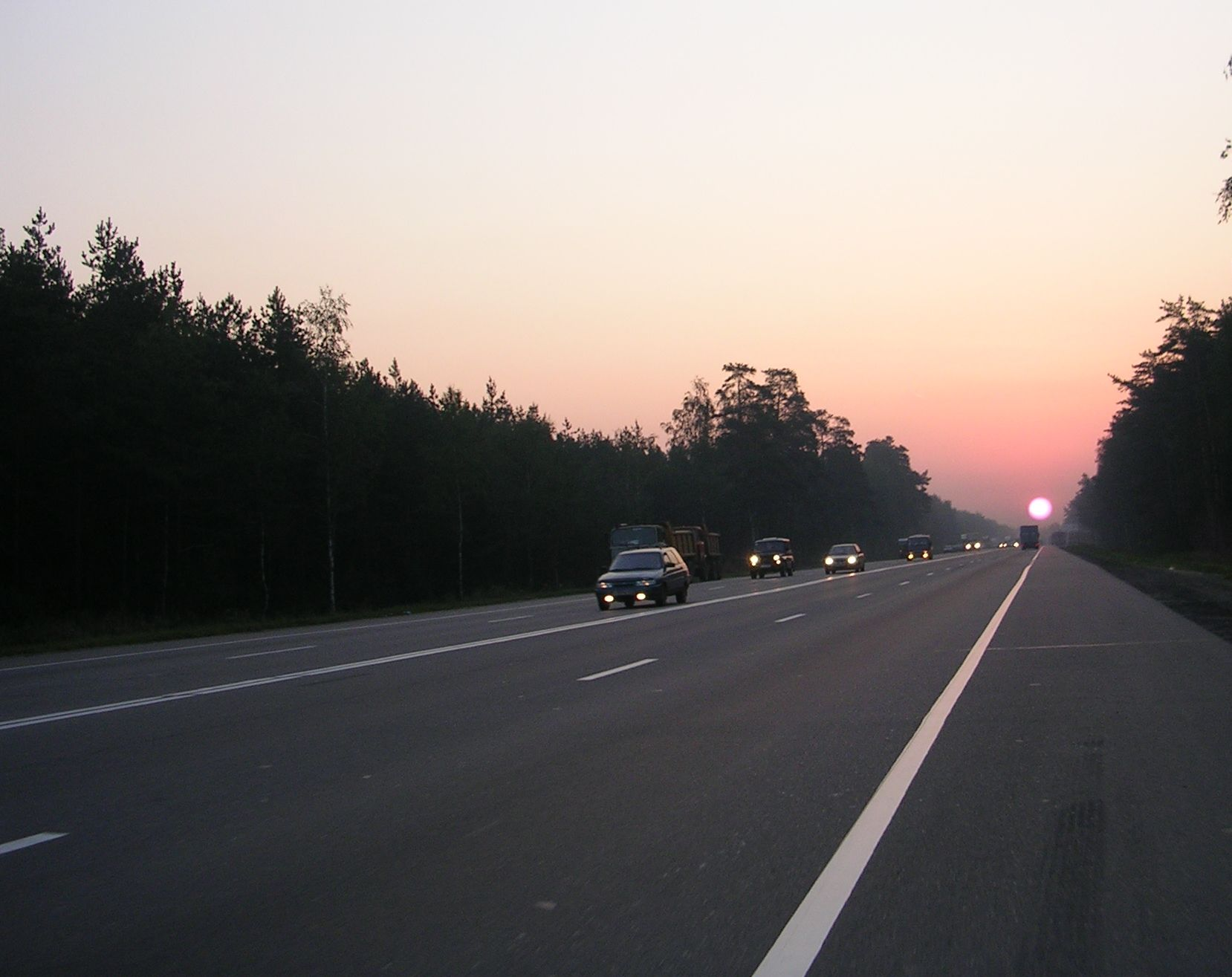
E22/ M 7 near Orekhovo-Zuyevo, Moscow Oblast, Russia

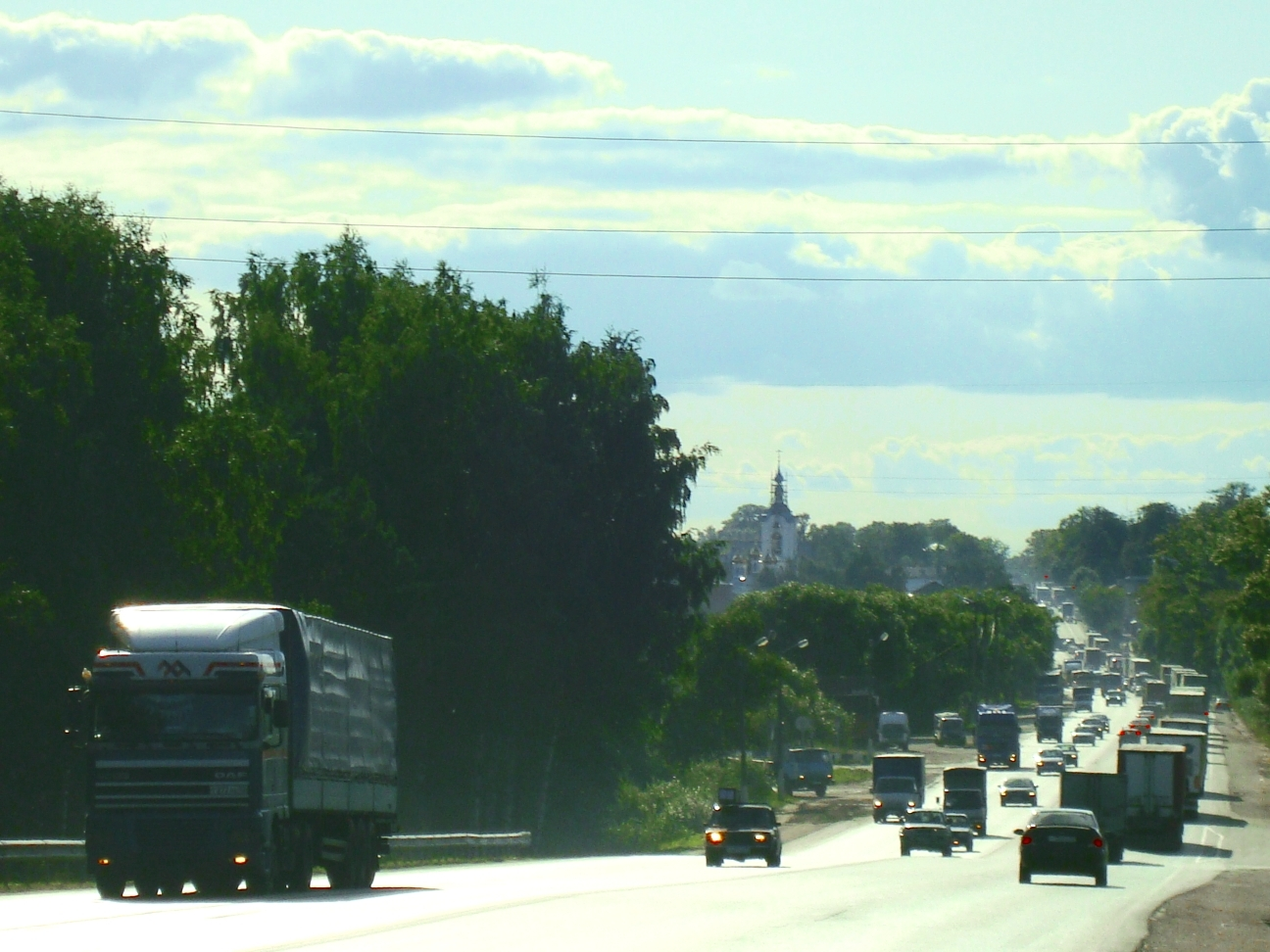
E22 in Pokrov, Russia
