= Blīdene =

Village in Latvia

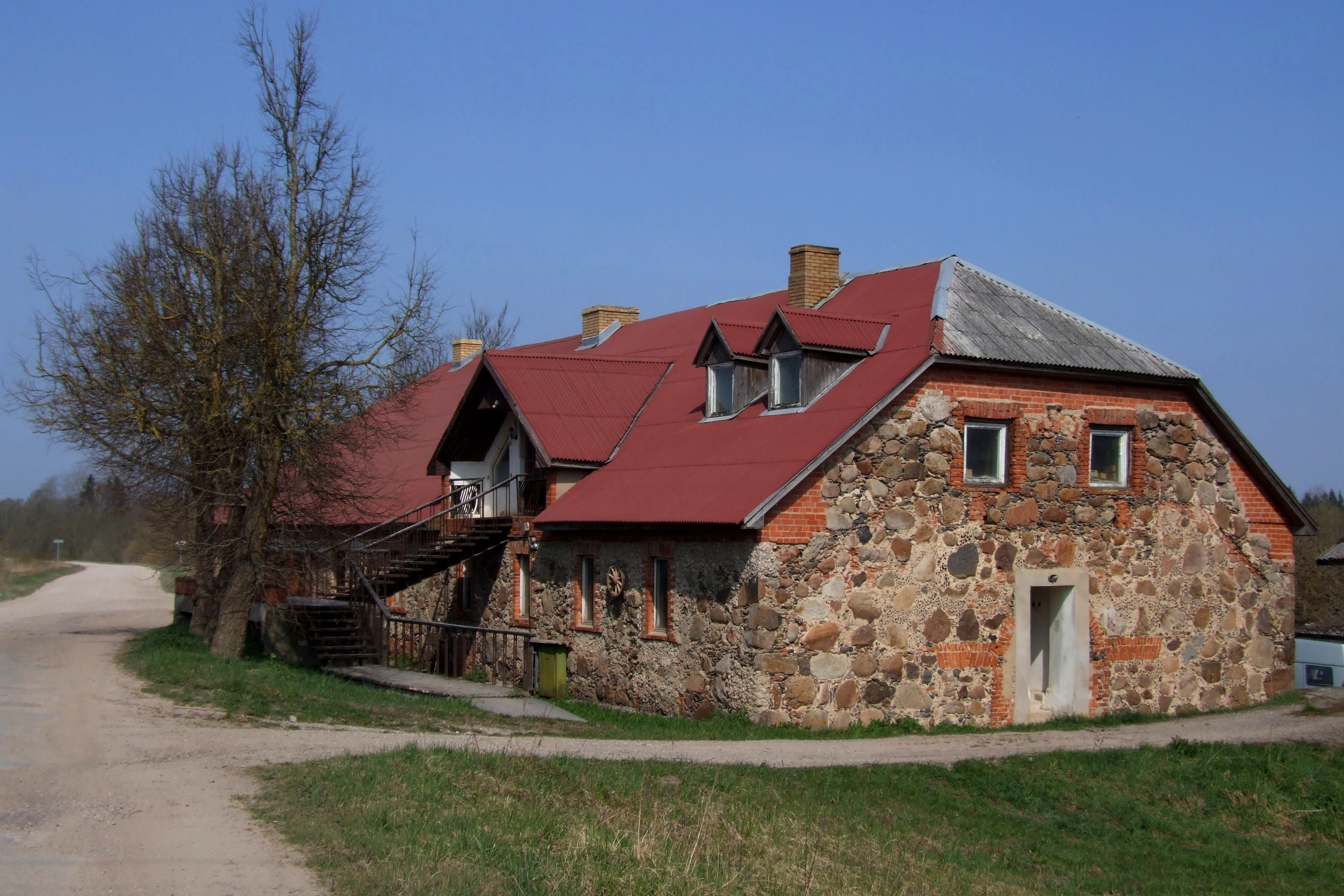
- Blīdene pub

- Location within Latvia
- Coordinates: 56°42′0.83″N 22°41′12.40″E
- Country: Latvia
- Municipality: Saldus Municipality
- Parish: Blīdene parish

Population
  - Total: 342
- Postal details: LV-3852 Blīdene

Blīdene (earlier also Blīdiene, Lielblīdiene) is a village in Blīdene Parish, Saldus Municipality in the Courland region of Latvia. It is the parish center. The village has formed on the Blīdene river shores and A9 highway.

It is 23 km away from the Municipality center Saldus, 15 km away from the nearest town Brocēni and 98 km from the capital Riga.

== History ==
The village was formed near the former Lielblīdenes Manor (Groß-Blieden) center. During the Soviet occupation of Latvia, Blīdene was Kolkhoz «Soviet Latvia» (later Sovkhoz «Blīdene») village. Blīdene has a parish management, elementary school, kindergarten, culture house, library, family doctor and many small stores. Lielblīdene manor construction is a local importance monument of cultural history.

Sculptor Karl Hans Bernewitz was born in Blīdene.
