= Rucava Parish =

Parish of Latvia

- parish of Latvia
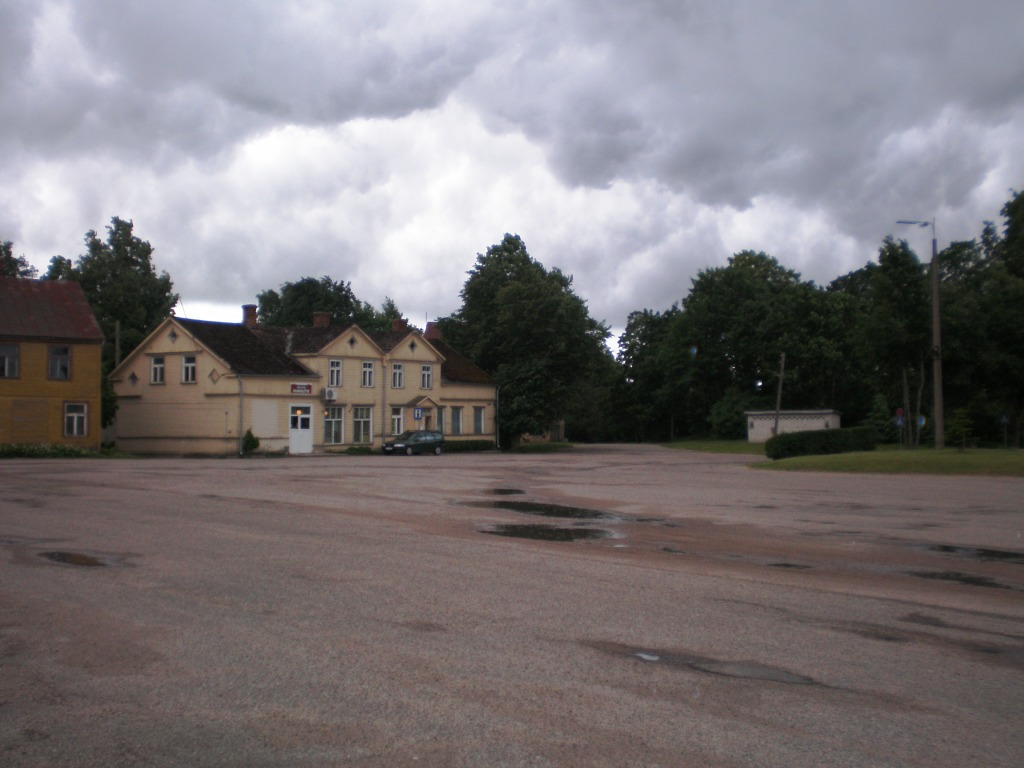

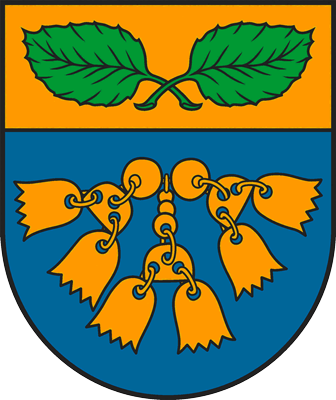
- 56°10′01″N 21°07′49″E

- Location within Latvia
- Country: Latvia

Area
  - Total: 237.64 km^{2} (91.75 sq mi)
  - Land: 225.25 km^{2} (86.97 sq mi)
  - Water: 12.39 km^{2} (4.78 sq mi)

Population (1 January 2026)
  - Total: 877
  - Density: 3.89/km^{2} (10.1/sq mi)

Rucava Parish (Latvian: Rucavas pagasts) is an administrative unit of South Kurzeme Municipality in the Courland region of Latvia. The parish has a population of 1250 (as of 1/07/2010) and covers an area of 238.1 km^{2}.

== Villages of Rucava Parish ==
- Bajāriņciems
- Ģeistauti
- Jūči
- Ķāķišķe
- Katuži
- Kliņķi
- Līkuma ciems
- Nida
- Palaipe
- Pape
- Papes Ķoņuciems
- Papes Priediengals
- Peši
- Pirkuļi
- Rucava
- Rucavas muiža
- Sviļu ciems
