= Karl Hans Bernewitz =

Baltic German sculptor

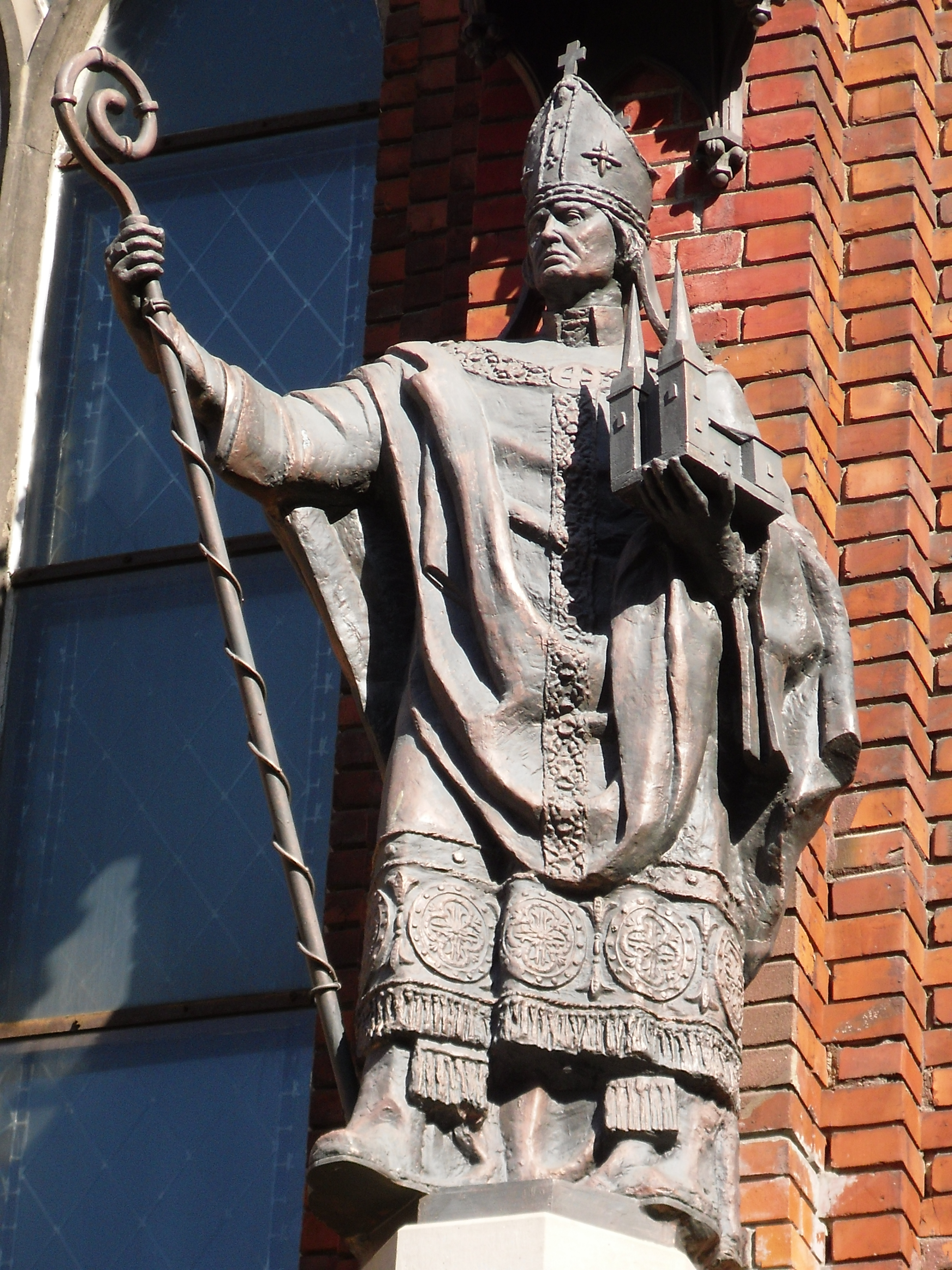
Albert of Riga, copy of an original statue by Karl Hans Bernewitz on the façade of Riga Cathedral

Karl Hans Bernewitz (Latvian: Kārlis Bernevics; 17 May 1858 – 19 December 1934) was a Baltic German sculptor.

He was born in Blīdene in present-day Latvia (then part of the Russian Empire). In 1871 he moved with his parents to Cēsis. He first learnt sculpting from August Volz in Riga. In 1881 he entered the Academy of Arts in Berlin, where he studied under Reinhold Begas, whose assistant he became. He contributed to several monumental groups Begas was commissioned to make. Bernewitz went to Italy in 1887, but settled in Berlin after his studies. In Berlin he worked both as a sculptor and as a designer, notably at the Royal Porcelain Factory. In 1904 he moved to Kassel to take up a teaching position at the art school there. He was promoted to Professor there in 1908. He died in Kassel in 1934.

Sculptures by Bernewitz include funerary monuments, portrait busts, and statuettes as well as a statue of Albert of Riga in the cloister of Riga Cathedral (1895), a sculpture Bookworm for the Murhardsche Bibliothek (today part of Kassel University Library) and a proposed quadriga for a monument to Emperor Wilhelm I in Berlin, among other works.
