= A6 road (Latvia) =

Road in Latvia

Coordinates: 56.931516°N 24.388142°E

A6
- Daugavpils šoseja

Route information
- Part of E22 E262
- Length: 306.5 km (190.5 mi)

Major junctions
- From: Riga
- A 5 near Salaspils; A 4 near Salaspils; P 80 near Koknese; A 12 at Jēkabpils; A 14 near Daugavpils; A 13 near Daugavpils
- To: Belarus border at Pāternieki P 20 P20

Location
- Country: Latvia

Highway system
- National Roads in Latvia
← A 5	→ A 7

The A6 is a main national road in Latvia. Its official name is Rīga–Daugavpils–Krāslava–Baltkrievijas robeža (Patarnieki), and it connects Riga with the Belarusian border at Pāternieki. The road has a total length of 306.5 km (190.5 mi), of which 256.6 km (159.4 mi) are state-owned and 49.9 km (31.0 mi) are municipal-owned road sections. It is commonly known in Latvia as the Daugavpils Highway (Daugavpils šoseja).

The A6 forms part of the international E-road network as European route E22 and European route E262, and is included in Latvia's TEN-T road network. At the Belarusian border the road continues toward Polotsk and Vitebsk as the Belarusian P20.

== Route description ==
The A6 starts in Riga and runs southeast and east through the Daugava corridor toward Latgale. According to the official route list, the road includes municipal sections in Riga, Salaspils, Ikšķile, Ogre, Ķegums, Lielvārde, Jēkabpils, Līvāni and Krāslava, with state-owned sections between them. In Riga the A6 follows Latgales iela, Krasta iela, Lāčplēša iela and Satekles iela, while in Krāslava it follows Augusta iela and Rīgas iela.

The road passes through or near Salaspils, Ikšķile, Ogre, Ķegums, Lielvārde, Koknese, Pļaviņas, Jēkabpils, Līvāni, Daugavpils and Krāslava. Near Daugavpils, the A6 uses the northern approach and bypasses the city centre before continuing east toward Krāslava and the Belarusian border.

Most of the A6 is a single-carriageway road. Divided sections include parts of the Riga–Ogre corridor and the Nīcgale–Daugavpils approach. The Nīcgale–Ļūbasta Lake section of the A6, approximately km 201.6–223.9, has separated carriageways with two lanes in each direction and is being reconstructed in stages.

Outside built-up areas the ordinary maximum speed limit is generally 90 km/h (56 mph), unless otherwise signed. In 2026, a seasonal maximum speed limit of 100 km/h (62 mph) was introduced on the A6 only on the Salaspils–Ikšķile section, km 19.65–28.30.

== History and development ==
A major alternative to the older A6 corridor east of Riga is the P80 Tīnūži–Koknese road. The P80 is a separate regional road with a length of 61.1 km (38.0 mi), and it is also included in the TEN-T network. It was opened on 7 November 2013 as the largest highway route built in Latvia since the restoration of independence. The project included about 60 km (37 mi) of new or reconstructed road and was intended to improve safety and relieve traffic on the older A6 corridor.

Earlier proposals also considered further development of the E22 corridor toward Riga and possible continuation of the higher-standard route east of Koknese, but the P80 has not legally replaced the A6 route. The current legal route list continues to define A6 as the Riga–Daugavpils–Krāslava–Belarus border road, while P80 remains a separate road.

== Reconstruction near Daugavpils ==
In April 2025, Latvijas Valsts ceļi began reconstruction of parts of the A6 four-lane section between Nīcgale and Daugavpils. The wider project covers about 23 km (14 mi) of the A6, together with a section of the Daugavpils bypass from Svente to the A6. The works were divided into three A6 sections: Nīcgale–Gančauski, Gančauski–Ļūbasta Lake at km 212.5–223.9, and Ļūbasta Lake–Daugavpils bypass at km 223.9–224.8.

The Gančauski–Ļūbasta Lake section is being rebuilt while retaining separated carriageways and two lanes in each direction; after reconstruction, the maximum speed limit there is expected to remain 90 km/h (56 mph) because several at-grade U-turn locations are being retained. By contrast, the approximately one-kilometre section from the Krāslava turn-off to the Daugavpils bypass is being narrowed and rebuilt as a single-carriageway road with one lane in each direction. The A6/A6 and A6/A14/P67 junctions are being rebuilt as roundabouts. Completion of these works is planned for summer 2026.

== Traffic ==
Latvijas Valsts ceļi publishes average daily traffic data for state roads. Its 2016–2025 dataset lists traffic intensity as the average number of vehicles per day. The annual average daily traffic of the A6 in 2025 was reported as 8,635 vehicles.

Average speed enforcement has been introduced on several A6 sections. In 2023, systems were operating or being introduced on the Koknese–Stukmaņi section, km 102.4–116.0, the section from the bridge over the Aiviekste in Pļaviņas to Banderi, km 133.5–139.2, and the Krustpils–Stūrnieki section, km 150.2–159.7.

== Major intersections ==
Road	Location or connection
A 5	Salaspils
A 4	Salaspils
P 10	Ikšķile; connection toward Inčukalns
P 8	Ķegums
P 32	Skrīveri
P 87	Aizkraukle
P 80	Koknese
P 79	Koknese
P 78	Pļaviņas
P 37	Pļaviņas
A 12	Jēkabpils
P 63	Līvāni
P 64	Nīcgale
A 14	near Daugavpils
A 13	near Daugavpils
P 65	Daugavpils

== Settlements on the route ==
- Riga
- Salaspils
- Ikšķile
- Ogre
- Ciemupe
- Ķegums
- Lielvārde
- Dzelmes
- Koknese
- Pļaviņas
- Jēkabpils
- Līvāni
- Jersika
- Daugavpils
- Krāslava

== Gallery ==
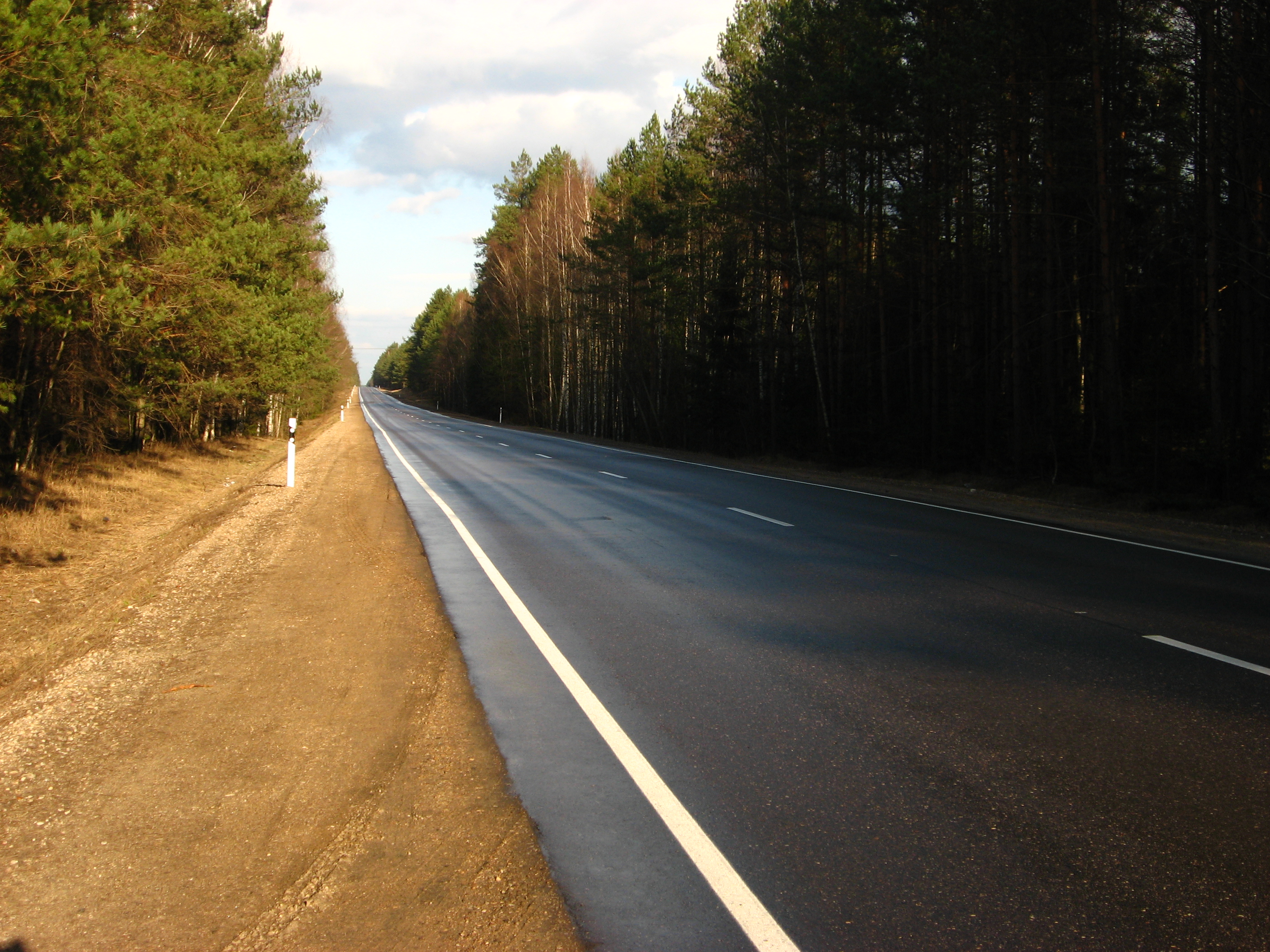
Daugavpils bypass on the A6, 2009

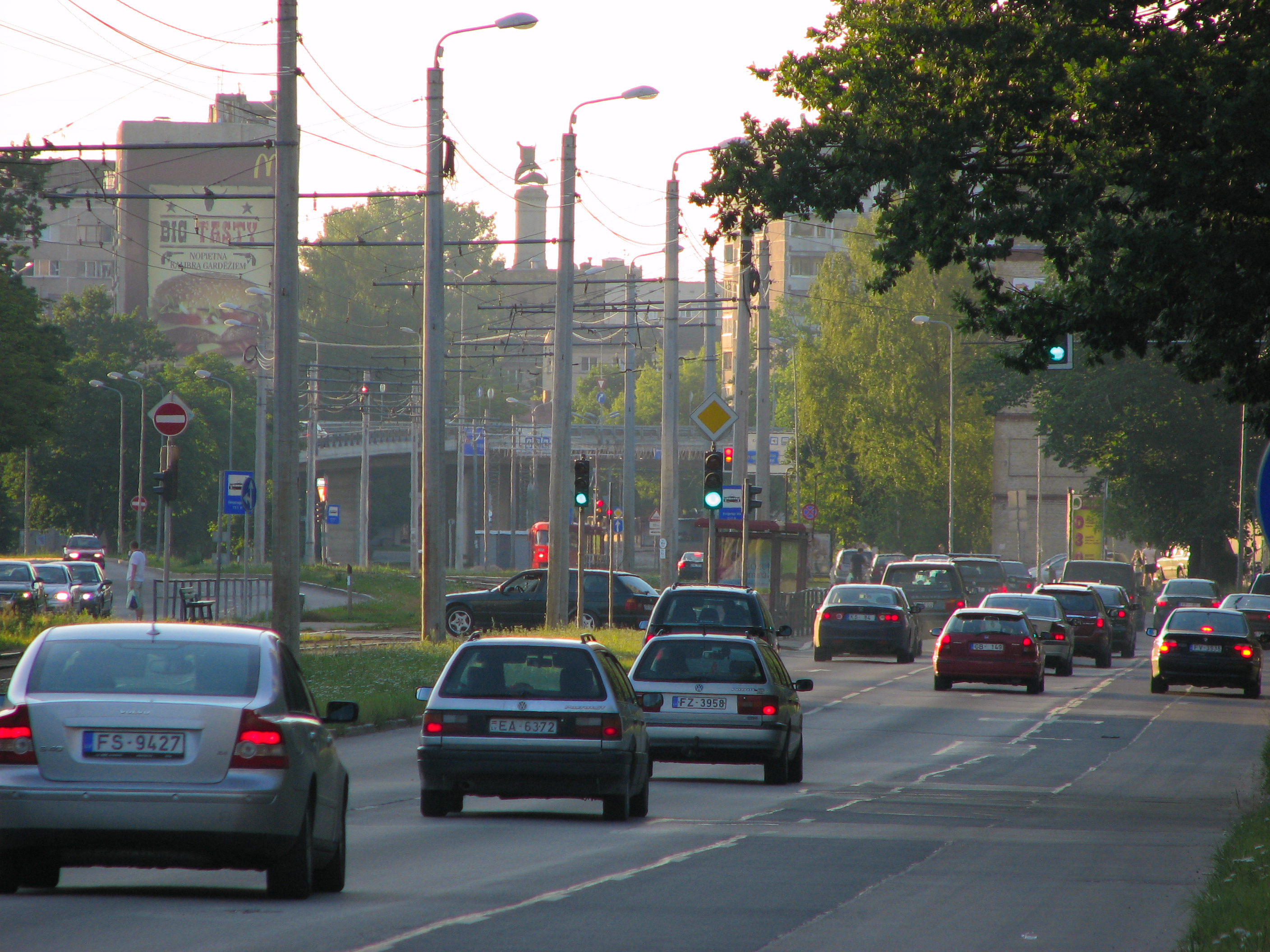
A6 in Riga, 2010

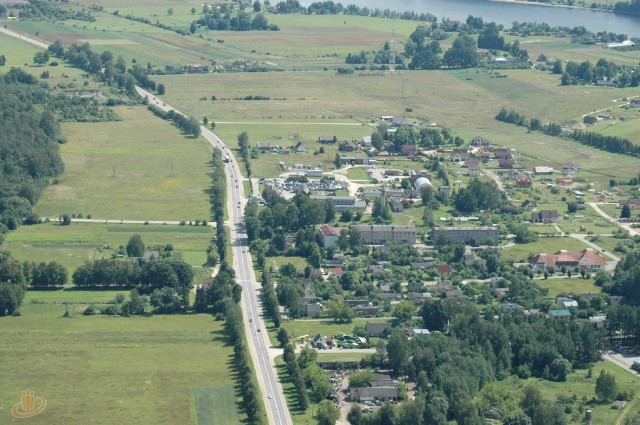
A6 from above near Ciemupe, 2010

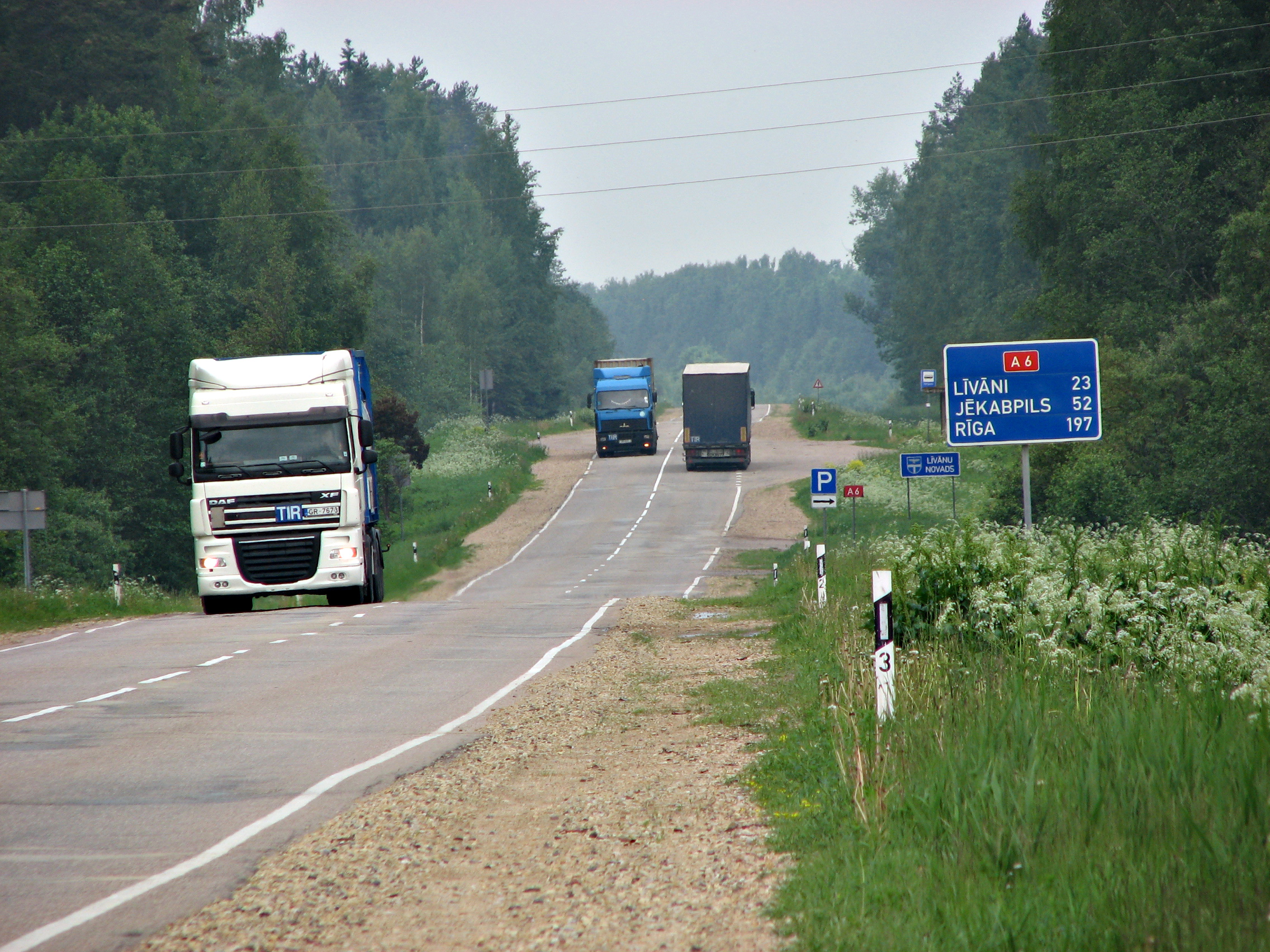
A6 near Jersika, 2010

== See also ==
- Transport in Latvia
- List of National Roads in Latvia
- P80 road (Latvia)
