= A5 road (Latvia) =

Road in Latvia

Coordinates: 56.931516°N 24.388142°E

A5
- Rīgas apvedceļš

Route information
- Part of E67 E77
- Length: 41 km (25 mi)

Major junctions
- From: Salaspils
- To: Babīte

Location
- Country: Latvia

Highway system
- National Roads in Latvia
| ← A 4 | → A 6 |

The A5 is a main national road in Latvia and part of the Riga bypass. It is officially named Rīgas apvedceļš (Salaspils–Babīte) and runs from the area of Salaspils to Babīte, forming the south-western section of the bypass around Riga. Its official length is 40.9 km (25.4 mi).

The A5 is connected with several of Latvia's main roads, including the A6, A7, A8, A9 and A10. It forms part of Latvia's TEN-T road network, as all main national roads in Latvia are included in TEN-T. The road also carries international traffic connected with the E67 and E77 corridors in the Riga area.

== Route and traffic ==
The road crosses the Daugava in the Salaspils area near the Riga Hydroelectric Power Plant and then runs west and south-west of Riga. Much of the route is a two-lane road, while the western end near Babīte and the A10 junction has two carriageways. The section from km 38.20 to km 40.82 near Babīte was reconstructed in 2024.

Traffic volumes on the A5 are high compared with many other Latvian roads, particularly on the western part of the bypass. In 2025, the road's counted sections had an average annual daily traffic of about 17,774 vehicles per day, based on the unweighted average of six A5 traffic-counting sections published by Latvijas Valsts ceļi. Heavy-goods traffic forms a significant part of traffic on the bypass. On the A8–A9 section, Latvijas Valsts ceļi reported traffic of more than 14,000 vehicles per day in 2023, of which about 20% was freight traffic.

== Safety improvements ==
In June 2023, 32 left turns were closed on the A5 between the A8 and A9 interchanges, from km 22 to km 34, as a traffic-safety measure. Some left turns remained at lower-traffic junctions.

On 14 August 2023, average speed enforcement began operating on the A5 between Stūnīši and Jaunmārupe, from km 23.1 to km 28.6. It was the first average speed control section introduced on the Riga bypass.

In 2024, the Babīte section of the road, from km 38.20 to km 40.82, was reconstructed. The works included reconstruction of the pavement structure, three asphalt layers, drainage improvements, changes to local traffic organisation, repairs to the railway overpass and improvements near the A10 interchange.

== Planned upgrades ==
The A5 is planned to be upgraded in stages to high-speed road standard. In May 2024, Latvijas Valsts ceļi submitted an updated environmental impact assessment for the reconstruction of the existing A5 between km 11.6, near the Ķekava bypass, and km 38.2, near the A10. The project would rebuild the existing two-lane road as a dual-carriageway road with four lanes, grade-separated junctions and the removal of at-grade left turns. The planned maximum speed for the upgraded section is 130 km/h.

A separate project concerns the eastern A5 section between the P85 / New Daugava Bridge junction and the Ķekava bypass. The project is intended to provide a new high-speed road connection associated with a new Daugava crossing. The environmental impact assessment report for this section was submitted to the Energy and Environment Agency on 26 June 2025, after public consultation held from 21 January to 21 February 2025.

== Crossings ==
| # | Road name | Location |
|---|---|---|
| 1 | P85 | Ķekava |
| 2 | P90 | Ķekava |
| 3 | P137 | Ķekava |
| 3 | A7 | Ķekava |
| 4 | A8 | Stūnīši |
| 5 | P132 | Jaunmārupe |
| 6 | A9 | Brīvklani |
| 7 | A10 | Pinķi |

== Major cities crossed ==
- Salaspils
- Ķekava
- Mārupe
- Pinķi
- Rīga

== Gallery ==
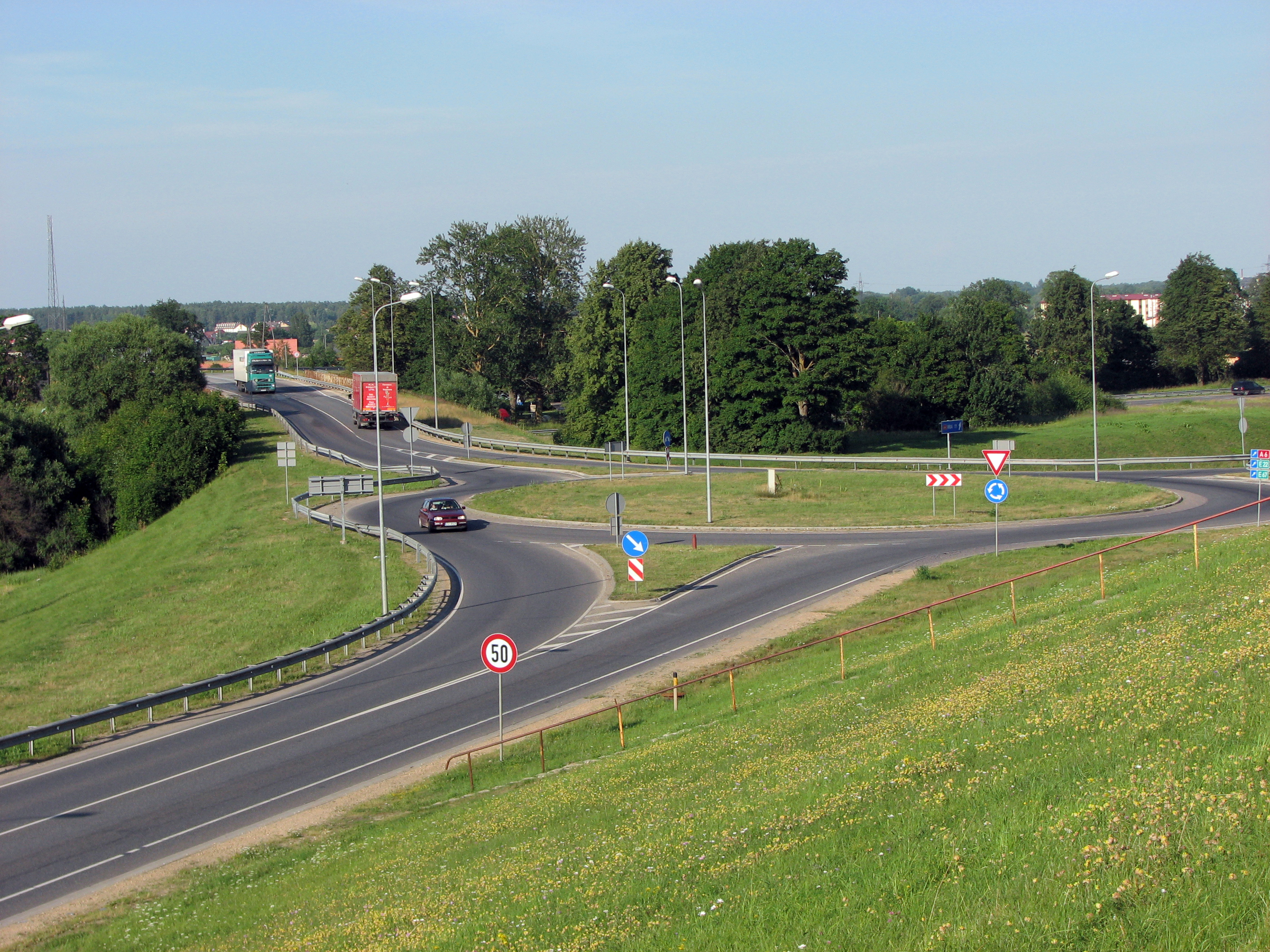
A5 near Salaspils in 2010.

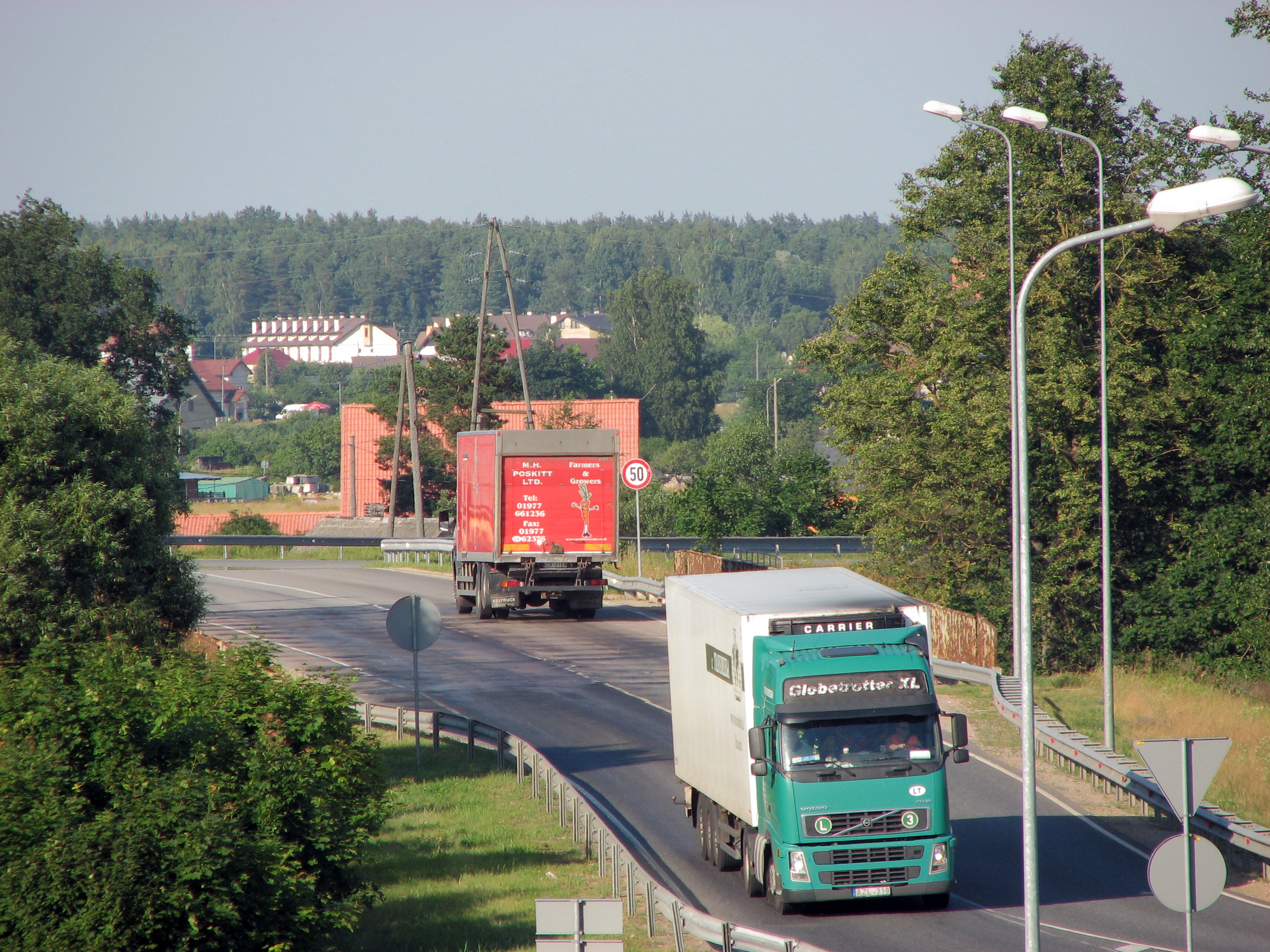
A5 near Salaspils in 2010.

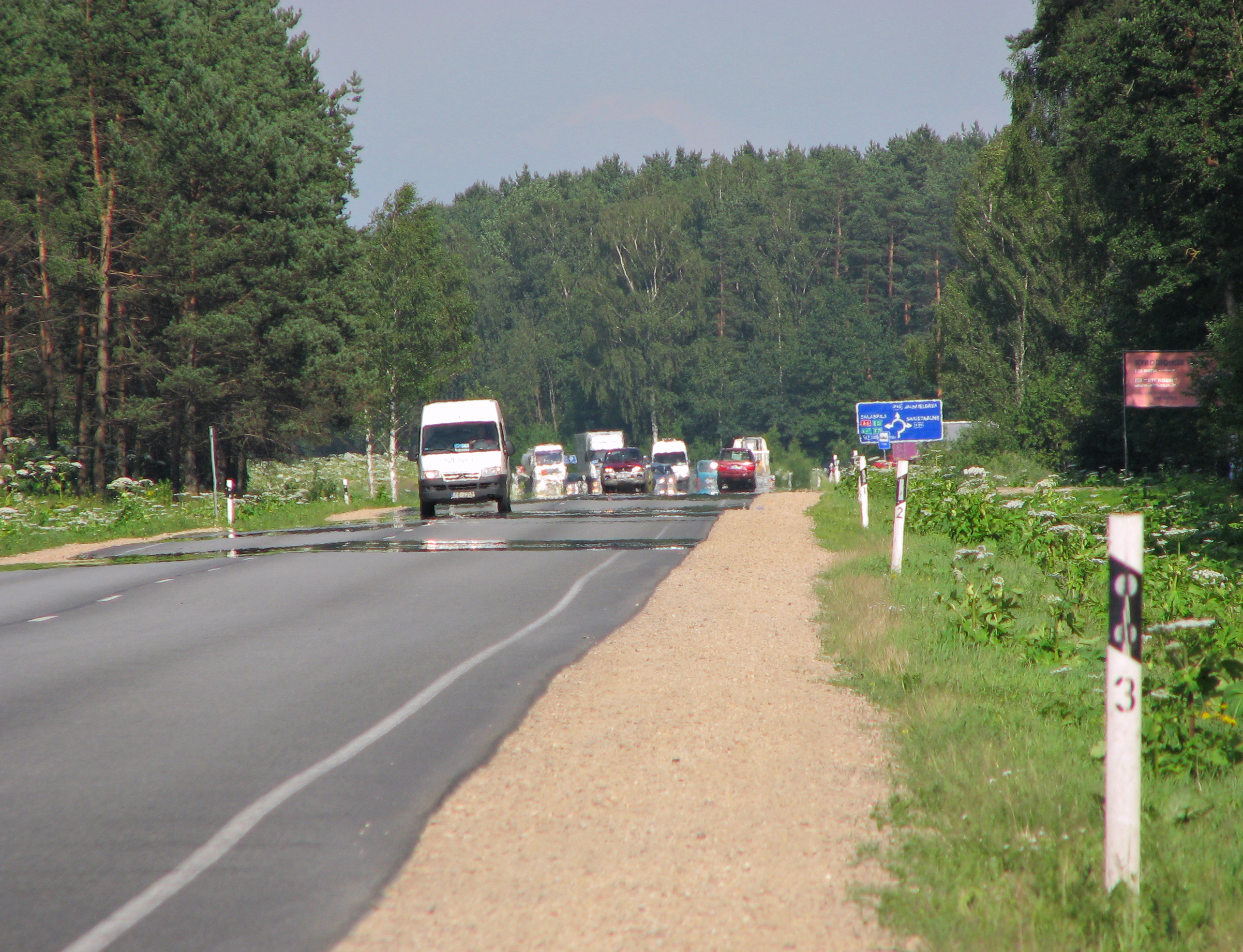
A5 near Ķekava in 2010.

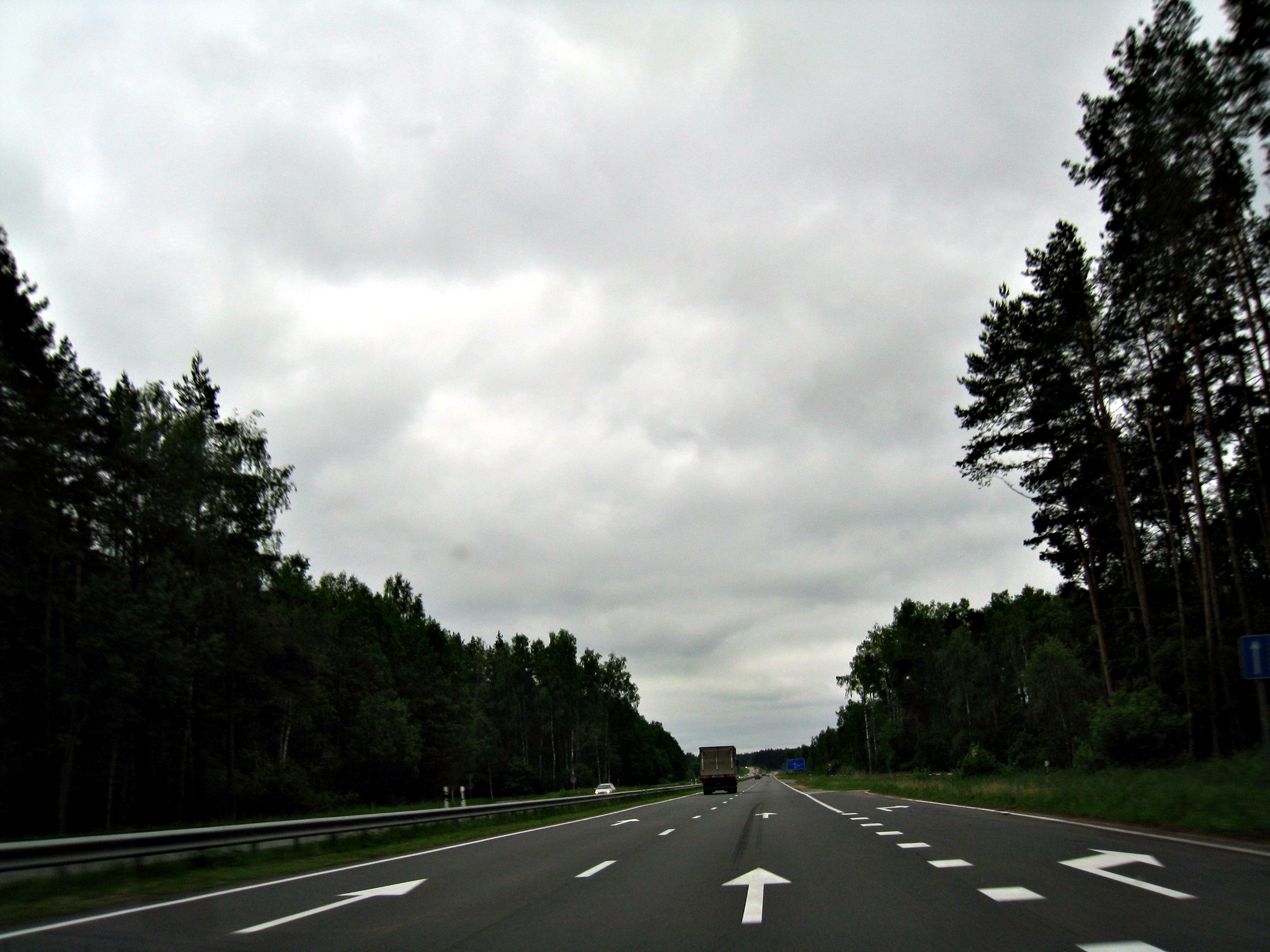
A5 near Pinķi in 2010.

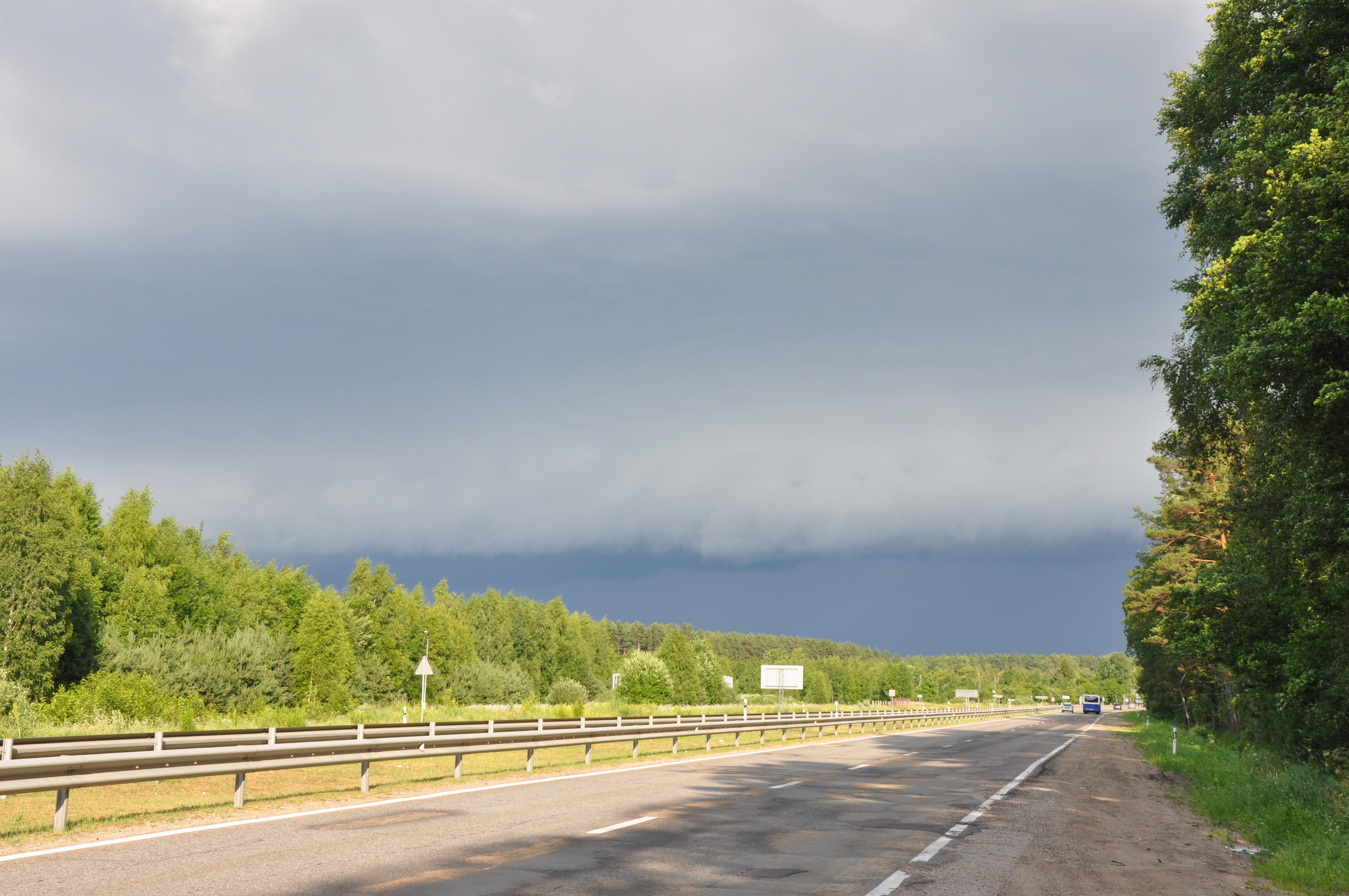
A5 near Babīte in 2011.

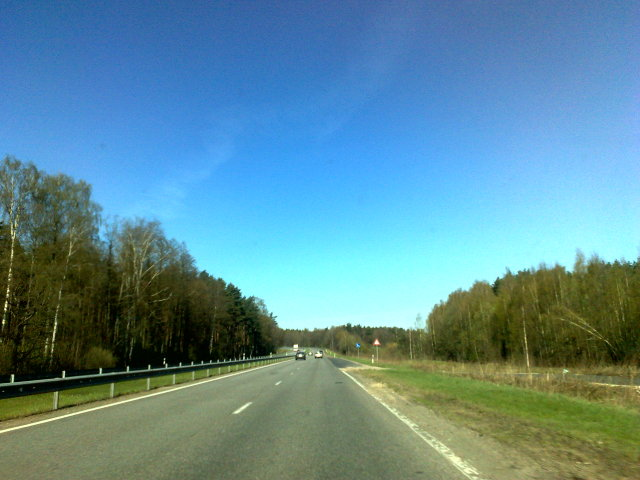
A5 near Babīte in 2010.

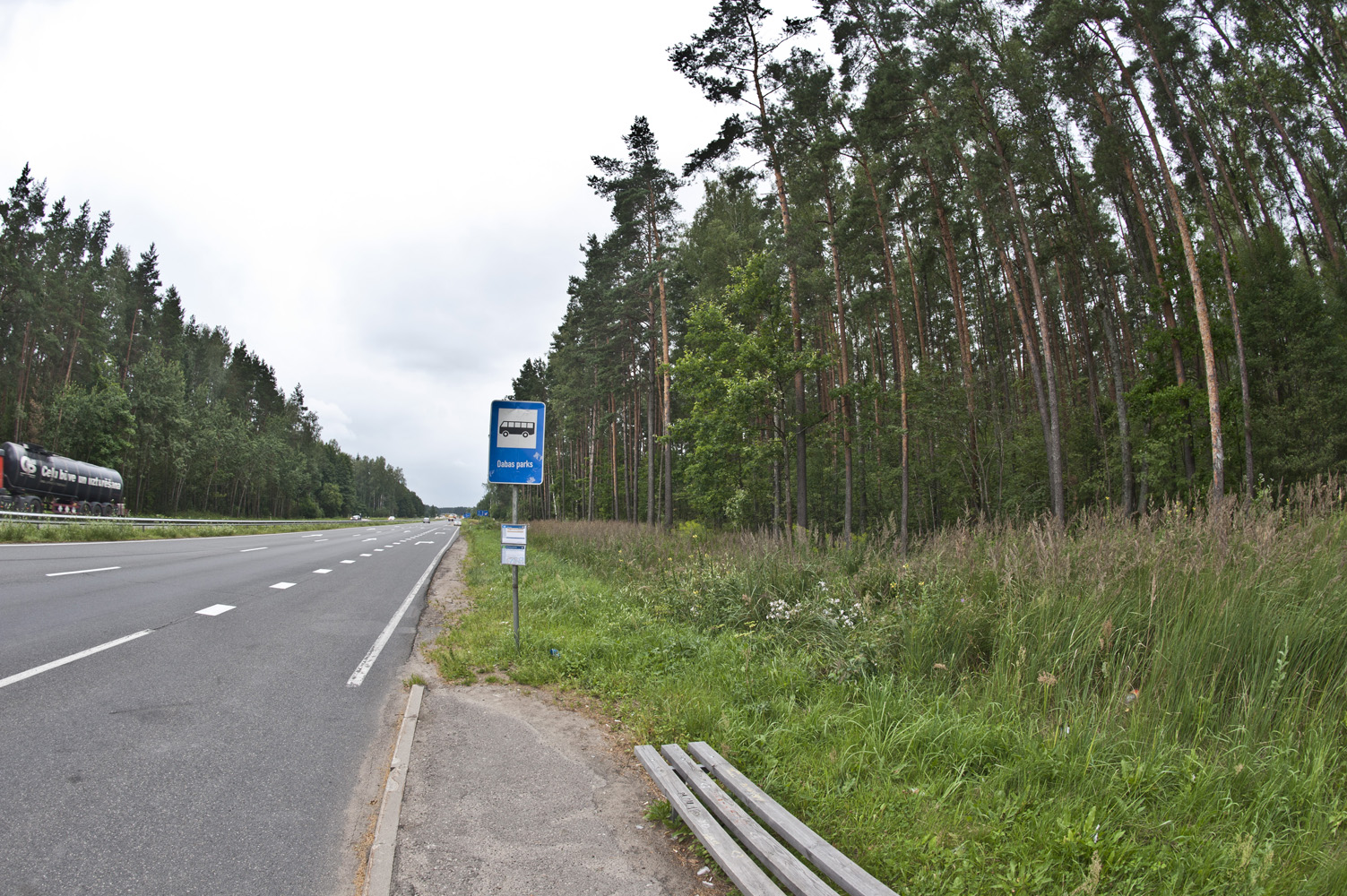
Bus stop on road A5 near Piņķi village.
