= Rucava =

Village in Latvia

- Village
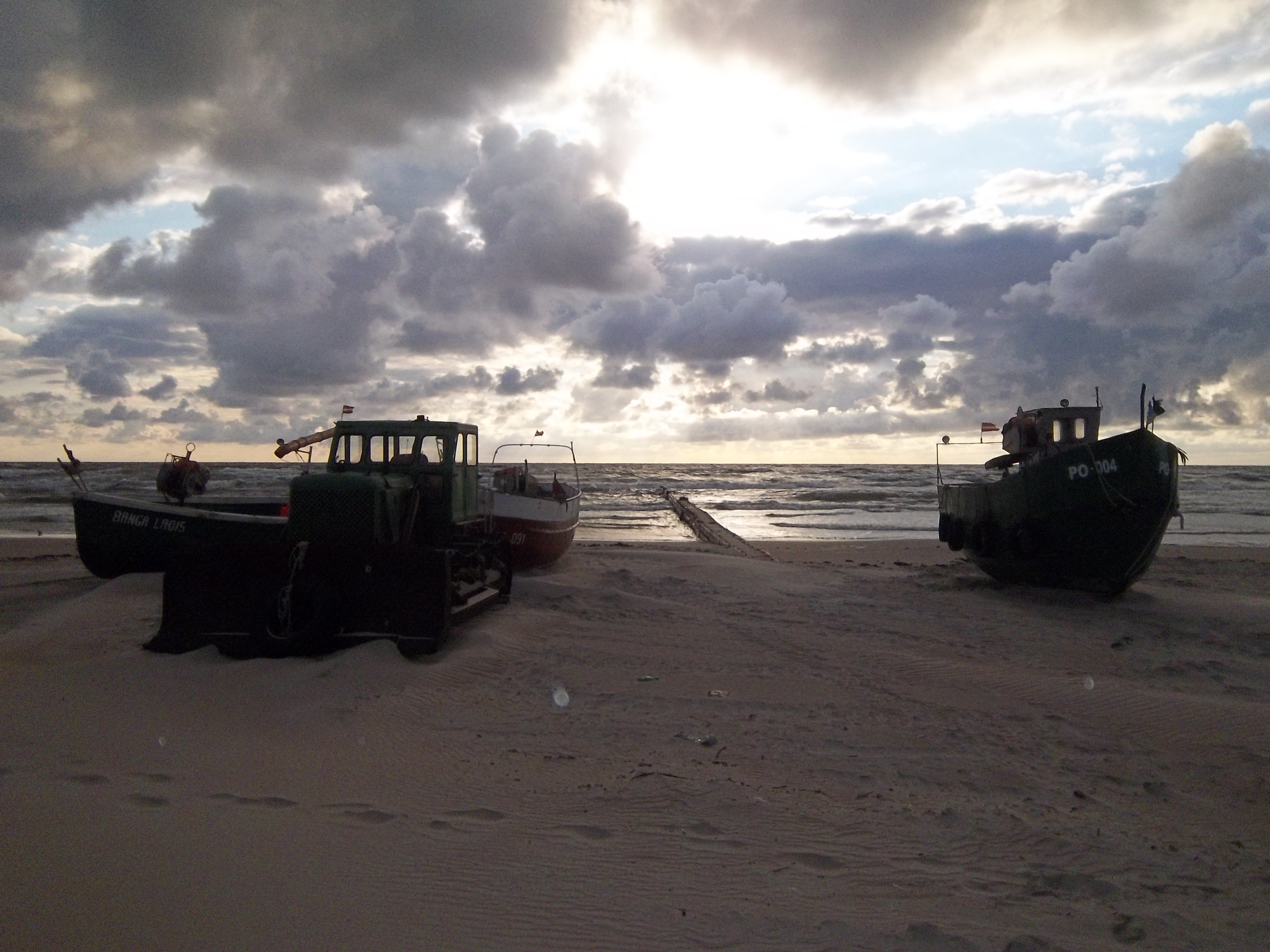
- Sunset in Rucava, August 2011

- Rucava's location in Latvia
- Coordinates: 56°9′33″N 21°9′43″E
- Country: Latvia
- Municipality: South Kurzeme
- Parish: Rucava
- First time mentioned: 1253

Area
  - Total: 0.66 sq mi (1.7 km^{2})

Population (2021)
  - Total: 495
- Postal code: LV-3477
- Climate: Cfb

Rucava (Lithuanian: Rukiava, German: Rutzau) is a village in the Rucava Parish of South Kurzeme Municipality in the Courland region of Latvia. Rucava had 495 residents as of 2021.

== Climate ==
Rucava has an oceanic climate (Köppen Cfb) closely bordering on a humid continental climate (Köppen Dfb).

Climate data for Rucava (1991-2020 normals, extremes 1923–present)
Month	Jan	Feb	Mar	Apr	May	Jun	Jul	Aug	Sep	Oct	Nov	Dec	Year
Record high °C (°F)	10.1 (50.2)	15.0 (59.0)	19.1 (66.4)	27.8 (82.0)	30.1 (86.2)	32.7 (90.9)	33.6 (92.5)	36.5 (97.7)	30.9 (87.6)	23.1 (73.6)	15.9 (60.6)	11.2 (52.2)	36.5 (97.7)
Mean daily maximum °C (°F)	1.0 (33.8)	1.2 (34.2)	4.7 (40.5)	11.5 (52.7)	16.8 (62.2)	19.6 (67.3)	22.5 (72.5)	22.2 (72.0)	17.4 (63.3)	11.3 (52.3)	6.2 (43.2)	2.8 (37.0)	11.4 (52.6)
Daily mean °C (°F)	−1.4 (29.5)	−1.5 (29.3)	1.1 (34.0)	6.2 (43.2)	11.2 (52.2)	14.9 (58.8)	17.7 (63.9)	17.3 (63.1)	13.1 (55.6)	8.0 (46.4)	3.7 (38.7)	0.6 (33.1)	7.6 (45.7)
Mean daily minimum °C (°F)	−4.3 (24.3)	−4.3 (24.3)	−2.5 (27.5)	1.3 (34.3)	5.4 (41.7)	9.2 (48.6)	12.2 (54.0)	11.9 (53.4)	8.4 (47.1)	4.4 (39.9)	1.4 (34.5)	−2.2 (28.0)	3.4 (38.1)
Record low °C (°F)	−37.9 (−36.2)	−33.7 (−28.7)	−29.8 (−21.6)	−13.8 (7.2)	−5.8 (21.6)	−2.9 (26.8)	2.2 (36.0)	0.3 (32.5)	−6.2 (20.8)	−14.9 (5.2)	−21.3 (−6.3)	−26.3 (−15.3)	−37.9 (−36.2)
Average precipitation mm (inches)	62.8 (2.47)	45.1 (1.78)	41.1 (1.62)	32.0 (1.26)	44.0 (1.73)	50.7 (2.00)	76.0 (2.99)	90.9 (3.58)	82.5 (3.25)	97.1 (3.82)	81.2 (3.20)	74.3 (2.93)	777.7 (30.63)
Average precipitation days (≥ 1 mm)	12	9	9	6	7	7	9	10	10	12	13	14	118
Source 1: LVĢMC
Source 2: NOAA (precipitation days 1991-2020)
