= Ziemeļblāzma Station =

Railway station on the Zemitāni–Skulte Railway in Latvia

Ziemeļblāzma
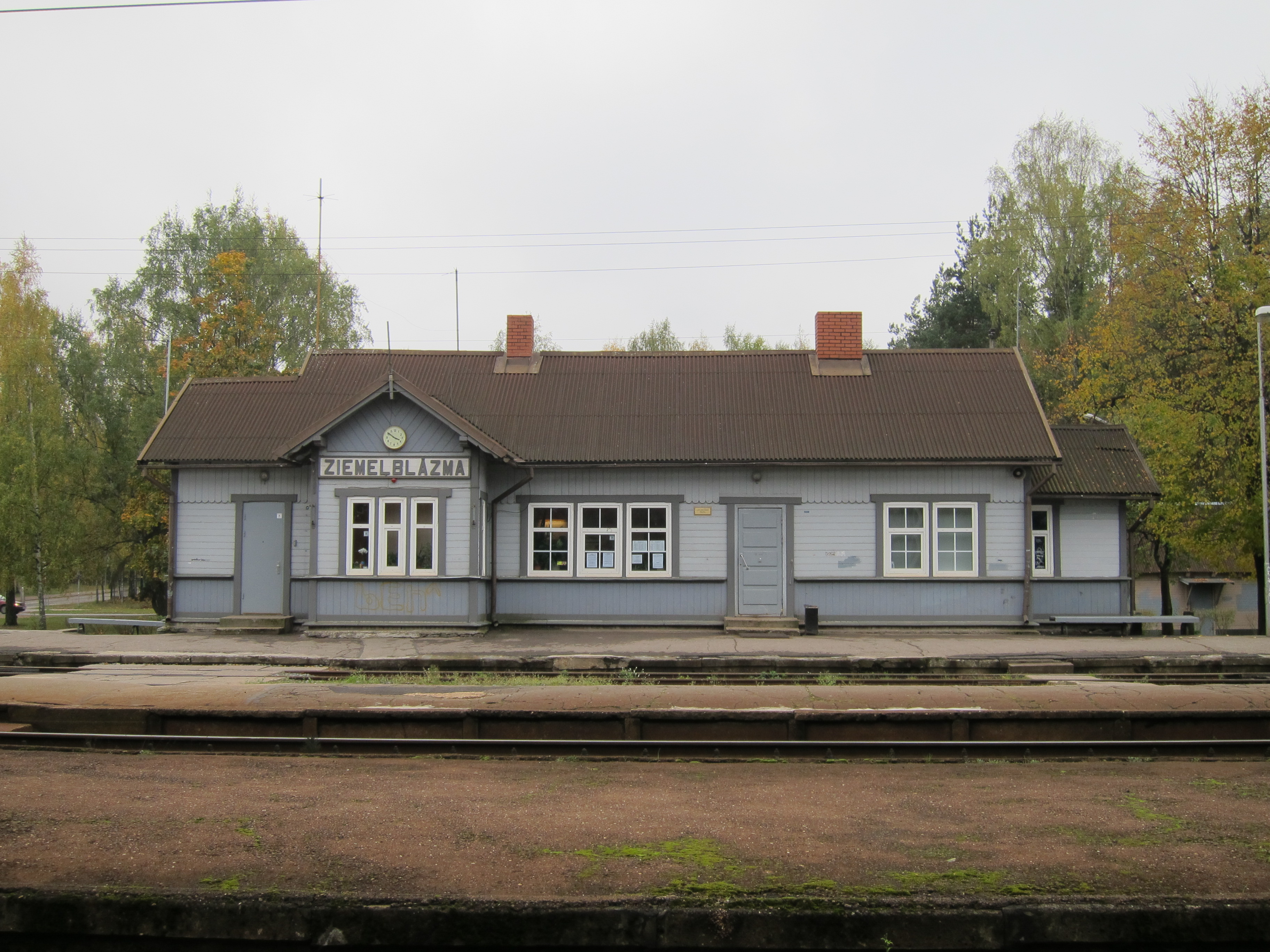

General information
- Location: Vecāķu prospekts 2C, Riga
- Coordinates: 57°2′10.01″N 24°6′47.76″E
- Platforms: 2
- Tracks: 4

History
- Opened: 1933
- Rebuilt: 2013
- Former names: Rīnūži

Services
Preceding station	LDz	Following station
Mangaļi towards Riga	Riga–Skulte Railway	Vecdaugava towards Skulte
Location

Ziemeļblāzma Station is a railway station on the Zemitāni–Skulte Railway, in Vecmīlgrāvis neighbourhood of Riga, Latvia.
