= Vivi (rail transit) =

Railway company based in Riga, Latvia

AS "Pasažieru vilciens"
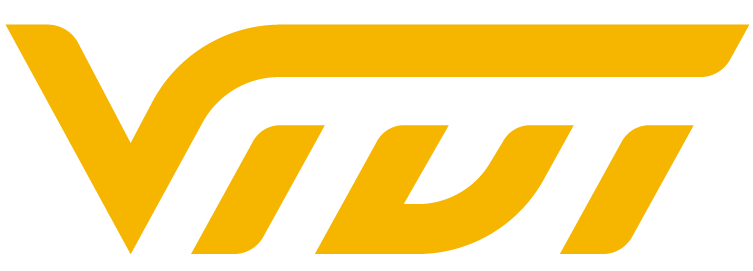

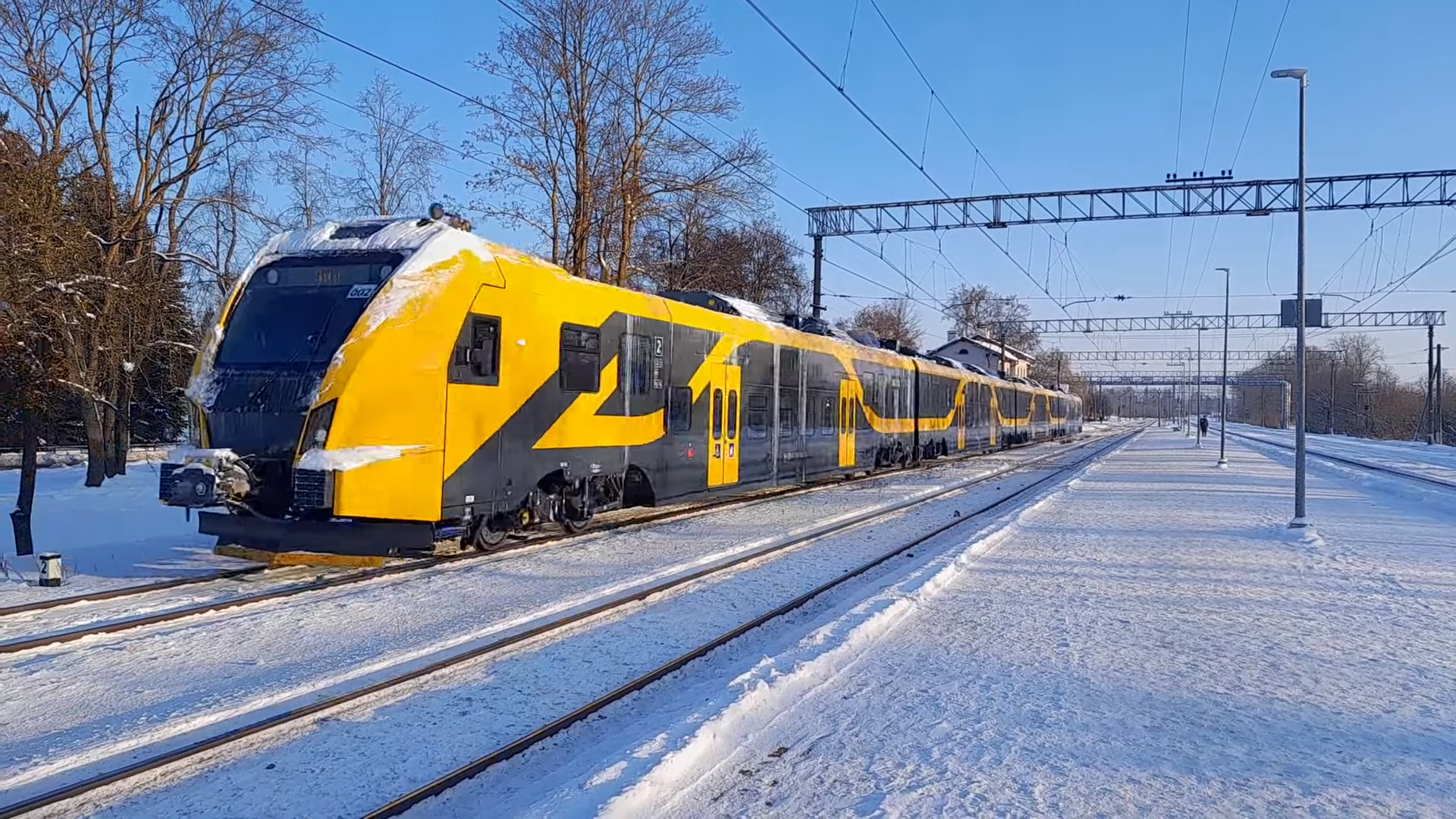
- Vivi Škoda 16Ev at Salaspils Station
- Trade name: Vivi
- Type: Public company
- Industry: Public transportation
- Founded: November 2, 2001; 25 years ago
- Headquarters: Riga
- Area served: Latvia
- Key people: Raitis Nešpors (Chairman of the Board)
- Revenue: 52,242,019 euro (2022)
- Net income: 604,239 euro (2022)
- Total assets: 84,407,115 euro (2022)
- Number of employees: 1,023 (2022)
- Website: www.vivi.lv

AS Pasažieru vilciens, operating as Vivi, is the sole passenger railway operator in Latvia, operating both electric and diesel trains on various lines throughout the country. Officially named AS "Pasažieru vilciens" (lit. 'Passenger train', abbreviated: PV), the company was founded in November 2001. It is fully owned by the Latvian state, with the Ministry of Transport acting as shareholder.

== History ==
Pasažieru vilciens was established on 2 November 2001 through the merger of two separate companies, PPU Elektrovilciens ("Electric Train") and PPU Dīzeļvilciens ("Diesel Train"), which were subsidiaries of the state-owned Latvijas Dzelzceļš (Latvian Railways, LDz). The company was created to separate domestic passenger services from other functions managed by LDz. Initially, Pasažieru vilciens was a 100% subsidiary of Latvijas Dzelzceļš, but in October 2008, it became an independent state-owned company.

As of 2017, Pasažieru vilciens employed 1,075 people. The company currently operates ten routes, four electric and six diesel, with its main operating base in the capital city, Riga. In 2019, it carried 18.6 million passengers.

On November 29, 2023, Pasažieru vilciens launched a rebranding initiative, adopting the new name Vivi (from the Latvian phrase vienā vilcienā, meaning "on one train" and "in one draw (of breath)") and a yellow-grey colour scheme. This change coincided with the introduction of new Škoda Vagonka electric trains to operation. The full rebranding process is set to be completed by the end of 2024, although the company's legal name, AS Pasažieru vilciens, will be retained.

== Routes ==
Vivi operates the passenger transports in the following electric train routes:

- Rīga – Carnikava – Saulkrasti – Skulte
- Rīga – Dubulti – Sloka – Ķemeri – Tukums 1 – Tukums 2
- Rīga – Jelgava
- Rīga – Ogre – Lielvārde – Aizkraukle

and in the following diesel train routes:

- Rīga – Jelgava – Dobele – Liepāja
- Rīga – Krustpils – Līvāni – Daugavpils – Krāslava – Indra
- Rīga – Krustpils – Rēzekne – Zilupe
- Rīga – Pļaviņas – Madona – Gulbene
- Rīga – Sigulda – Cēsis – Valmiera – Valga

the following routes have ended service in recent years

- Rīga – Ērgļi (2007)
- Rīga – Reņģe (2010)
- Rīga – Ventspils (2010)

PV routes
| Riga to | Locomotive | Coach | Approximate | | Notes |
| Riga to | Locomotive | Coach | ticket price (euro) | travel time | Notes |
|---|---|---|---|---|---|
| Aizkraukle | D/E | O/K | 2.18 - 3.60 | 1 h - 1 h 36 min | |
| Carnikava | E | O | 1.05 - 1.40 | 39 min - 42 min | |
| Cēsis | D | O/K | 3.50 | 1 h 15 min - 1 h 49 min | |
| Daugavpils | D | O/K | 7.05 - 7.75 | 2 h 41 min - 3 h 36 min | |
| Dobele | D | O | 2.85 | 1 h 07 min - 1 h 08 min | |
| Gulbene | D | O | 7.05 | 3 h 15 min - 3 h 22 min | |
| Indra | D | O | 9.45 | 3 h 37 min - 3 h 40 min | |
| Jelgava | D/E | O | 1.43 - 2.15 | 40 min - 45 min | |
| Jūrmala | E | O | 1.05 - 1.40 | 26 min - 36 min | |
| Krustpils | D | O/K | 4.40 - 5.10 | 1 h 35 min - 2 h 23 min | |
| Lielvārde | D/E | O | 1.43 - 2.15 | 47 min - 1 h 05 min | |
| Liepāja | D | O | 7.20 | 3 h 15 min | |
| Līvāni | D | O/K | 5.35 - 6.05 | 1 h 58 min - 2 h 39 min | |
| Madona | D | O | 5.25 | 2 h 34 min | |
| Ogre | D/E | O/K | 1.05 - 2.10 | 27 min - 48 min | |
| Pļaviņas | D | O/K | 4.00 - 4.70 | 1 h 21 min - 2 h 06 min | |
| Rēzekne | D | O/K | 7.20 - 7.90 | 2 h 44 min - 3 h 36 min | |
| Saulkrasti | E | O | 1.43 - 1.90 | 59 min - 1 h 14 min | |
| Sigulda | D | O/K | 1.90 | 53 min - 1 h 24 min | |
| Tukums 1 | E | O | 1.80 - 2.40 | 1 h - 1 h 18 min | |
| Valga, Estonia | D | O/K | 5.60 | 2 h 41 min - 3 h 18 min | Shared station with Valka, Latvia. |
| Valmiera | D | O/K | 4.20 | 1 h 51 min - 2 h 37 min | |
| Vecāķi | E | O | 0.60 - 0.80 | 26 min - 27 min | |
| Zilupe | D | O | 8.95 | 4 h 35 min - 4 h 39 min | |

A 1 Euro fee must be paid if a train ticket is purchased from the conductor while on the train, provided that the station from which the ticket is being bought is open at the time.

| Locomotive | | Coach |
|---|---|---|---|
| D | Diesel | O | open seating |
| E | Electric | K | reserved seating and a higher level of comfort |

== Stations ==
Pasažieru vilciens logo (2012–December 2023)

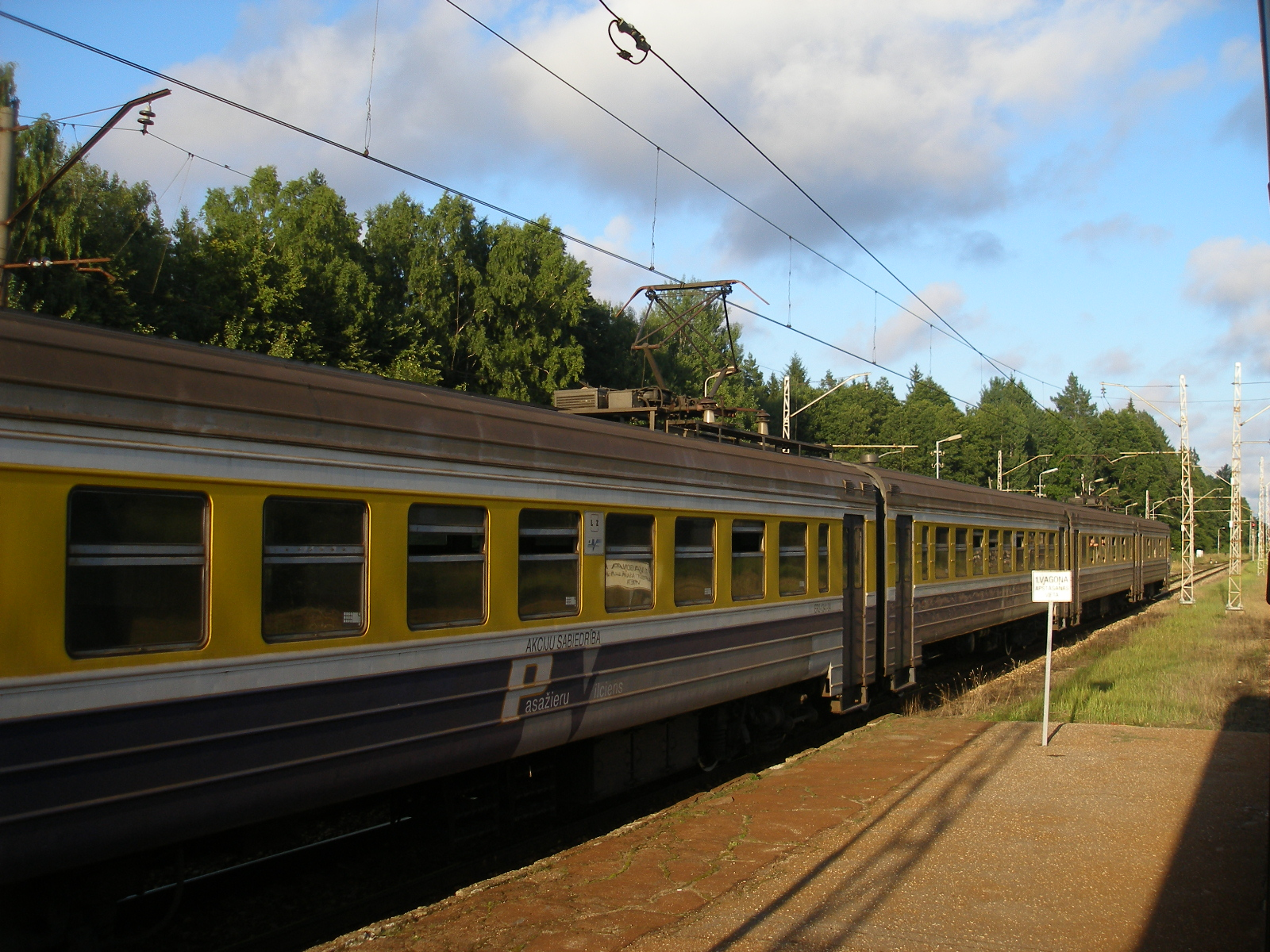
Previous PV logo (before 2012) on the side of a railcar. Livery in use until 2023 phaseout, logo dropped in 2020 and 2021.

The main stations on the Vivi network are:

- Aizkraukle
- Carnikava
- Cēsis
- Daugavpils
- Dobele
- Dubulti
- Jelgava
- Krustpils
- Ķemeri
- Lielvārde
- Liepāja
- Līvāni
- Madona
- Ogre
- Pļaviņas
- Rēzekne
- Rīga
- Saulkrasti
- Sigulda
- Skulte
- Sloka
- Torņakalns
- Tukums
- Valga (Estonia)
- Valmiera
- Vecāķi
- Zemitāni
- Zilupe

== Rolling stock ==
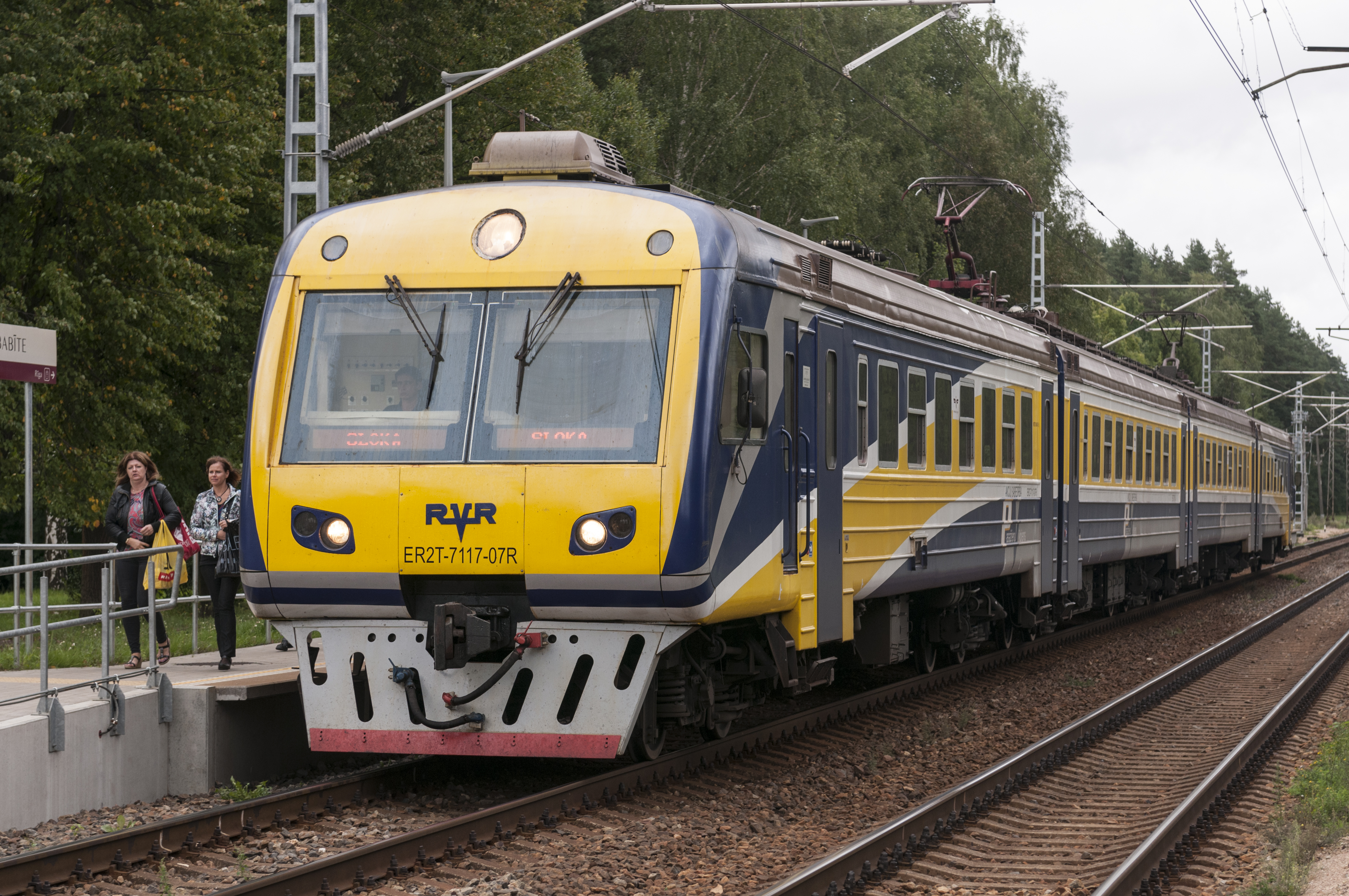
RVR ER2T passenger train after modernization

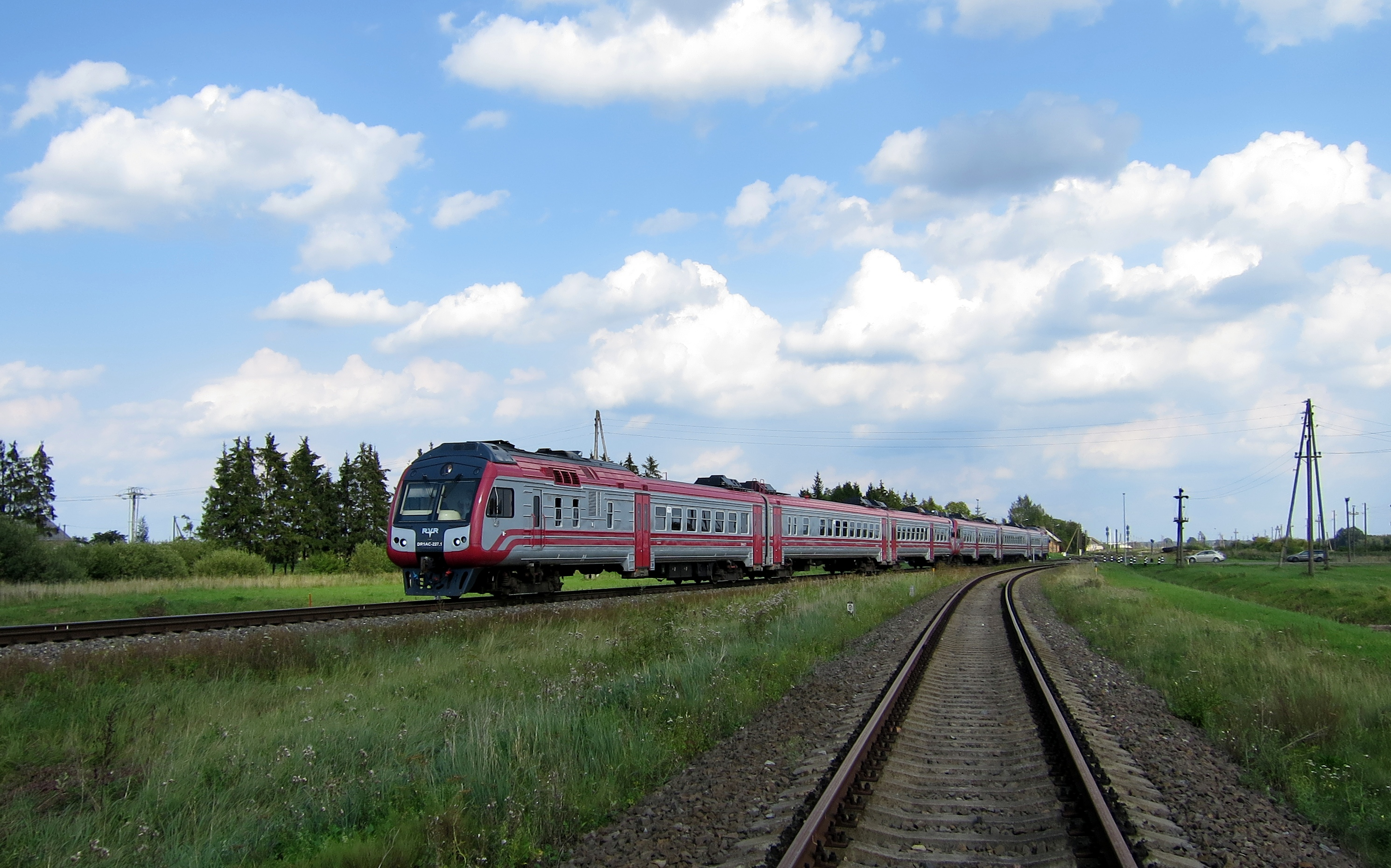
RVR DR1AC passenger train.

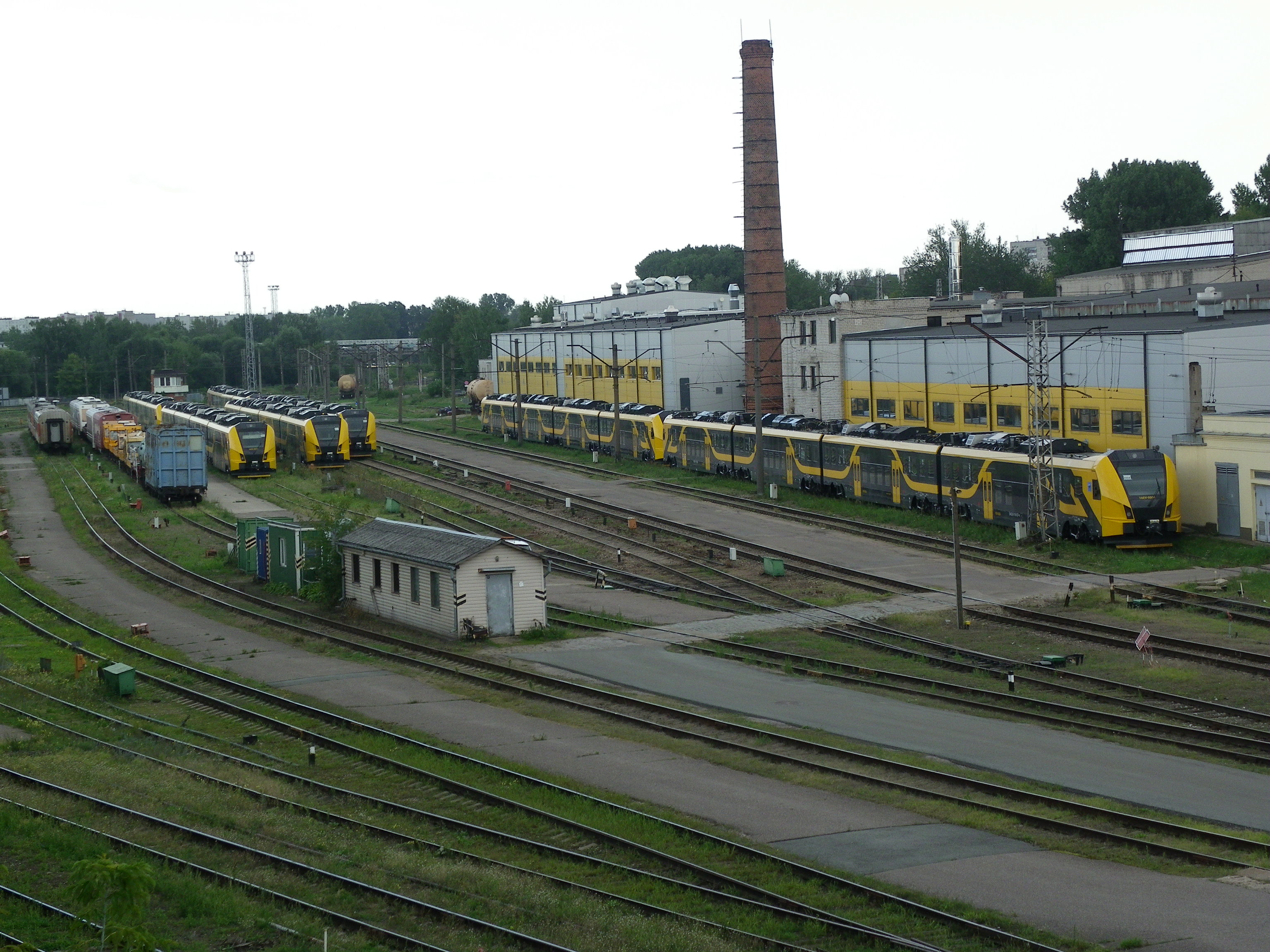
Škoda 16Ev electric trains in Vagonu Parks Station, Riga

The current rolling stock consists of both modern Škoda 16Ev electric trains and elderly Soviet-period diesel trains built locally by Rīgas Vagonbūves Rūpnīca (RVR) that are mostly kept in reserve.

Previously, electric trains made only by RVR were used, which were gradually refurbished since the early 2000s. In 2016 PV received 19 extensively modernized DR1A DMU train wagons from DMU vilcieni in cooperation with RVR, Daugavpils Lokomotīvju Remonta Rūpnīca and Zasulauks depot. However, LSM reported in October 2016 that the refurbished wagons soon experienced quality issues.

The livery of the RVR electric trains and some diesel trains is yellow and blue, while some refurbished DMUs are in red and white. Since 2023, the new Škoda EMUs and a part of the DMUs have been painted in signal yellow, anthracite gray and dark gray.

| Class | Type | Number | Year | Manufacturer |
|---|---|---|---|---|
| DR1A | DMU | 31 | 1973 | RVR |
| DR1AC | DMU | 6 | 2016 | DMU vilcieni with RVR |
| DR1AM | DMU | 16 | 1998 | RVR |
| ER2T | EMU | 25 | 1987 | RVR |
| Škoda 16Ev | EMU | 32 | 2023 | Škoda Vagonka |

=== Future upgrades ===
==== Electric trains ====
The first project for the procurement of new trains was announced in 2010 and 2011. In 2012 PV ordered 34 three-car electric multiple unit trains and seven three-car diesel multiple unit trains from CAF to be built on the Civity platform, with plans to manufacture them in cooperation with RVR. Later that year the contract was halted due to irregularities and an appeal from Stadler with the European Commission, an initial financial supporter of the project, and a new procurement organized. A hire/purchase contract for 25 Stadler FLIRT EMUs was likewise cancelled in July 2014 after an appeal from the other participant, Hyundai Rotem, and another tender organized.

In December 2015, four contenders – Talgo, CAF, Stadler Polska and Škoda Vagonka – continued participation in the second stage of the train procurement project. The contract includes the delivery of 32 electric trains with a capacity of 450 each, from 2020 to 2023, maintenance equipment, spare parts for five years and staff training. Talgo's VitTal was announced as the provisional winner of the €225.3 million contract in November 2018 although Škoda rejected the methodology used to assess price competitiveness. Škoda and CAF filed a successful appeal of the results of the procurement in December, while Stadler expressed disappointment at the results. After reviewing the results of the contest under instructions from the government's procurement watchdog agency, the Procurement Monitoring Bureau (PMB), PV announced on February 15, 2019 that the offer from Škoda worth €241.88 million has been selected as the new winner, based on revised electricity consumption cost estimates. Talgo announced in a press release the same day that they will contest the decision.

On May 21, 2019, PV announced that after the second revision of the submitted bids, Škoda was again confirmed as the winner, however, the decision could yet again be contested. The offer of Talgo was mentioned as to have had a lower price per unit, but the maintenance costs of Škoda trains were found to be lower with the total cost lower as well. Minister of Transport Tālis Linkaits commented on this that due to potential issues regarding the implication of Škoda Transportation A.S., a subsidiary of Škoda Transportation Group and a sister company of Škoda Vagonka, in recent corruption scandals concerning the Rīgas Satiksme public transport company, a failure to wrap up the procurement by the end of the year might have led to the dissolution of PV. The PMB turned down the final complaint by Talgo on July 4, giving PV the go-ahead to sign a contract with Škoda Vagonka. In a statement, the PV predicted that they would receive the first trains in late 2021, with the last ones being shipped in late 2023.

The contract between PV and Škoda Vagonka a.s. was finally signed on 30 July 2019. Under the agreement, all 32 EMU trains were to be delivered by 2023 or 140 weeks after the contract takes effect. Each 109-meter-long four-car train with a top speed of 160 km/h would accommodate 436 seated and 450 standing passengers. The trains were expected to operate services from Riga to Aizkraukle, Tukums, Jelgava and Skulte, as well as the inter-urban routes from and to Krustpils, Daugavpils and Rēzekne which are expected to be modernized and electrified at 25 kV 50 Hz for completion by the end of 2023. The planned electrification of the eastern-bound routes was postponed in 2022: the Aizkraukle–Krustpils section is to be elecrified by 2028; lines to Rēzekne, Daugavpils and Valka by 2035; and the ones to Ventspils and Liepāja by 2040. In February 2020, a new signal yellow, anthracite gray and dark gray livery design created by Teika Design Studio for the future trains was unveiled by PV.

Due to 2022 Russian invasion of Ukraine, the end date of full delivery was postponed till at least end of 2023, since originally it was planned to deliver all trains to Latvia on tracks through Ukraine and Belarus, due to the same track gauge. The first four-car train was delivered in June 2022 in parts by road through Poland and Lithuania and was used for testing purposes in the coming months. Each train was designed for 436 passengers. While initially it was said that the new trains would enter service in January 2023, cited problems like production delays caused by the Russian invasion of Ukraine and the COVID-19 pandemic, and a long certification process still in progress, repeatedly pushed this back to 'no earlier' than November. By June 2023, 14 electric trains had been assembled in Latvia, with nine more left to go until the end of the year. The final deliveries were planned for the first half of 2024. The first regular journey of the new model took place on December 15, 2023, on the route Riga – Dubulti. Trains heading for Aizkraukle, Tukums and Skulte followed, concluding with the Jelgava route on December 16.

In January 2024, five of the newly delivered trains stopped running after several technical problems. On January 2, the train on the Saulkrasti–Rīga route stopped at Garciems station after the train's pantograph went down and the cabin heating stopped working. After several other repeated incidents with the new trains, Transport Minister Kaspars Briškens and Vivi demanded explanations from Škoda Vagonka about the defects and on January 5 informed passengers about the possibility to request compensation in case of canceled trains. On January 25, 2024, the members of the company's board announced their resignations, as they claimed that 'solving the crisis caused by the new electric trains is beyond the board's functions and scope'. Later, the Ministry of Transport announced that a temporary council had been appointed in its place. However, on January 26, the Minister of Transport announced that it considered to return the sets of the new trains back to the manufacturer as defects and to ask the government for money for the overhaul of the old trains. Ultimately, these plans were not approved, with Škoda receiving fines. For the 2024/25 winter season, Vivi announced that it had improved staff training and set up a 24-hour operational technical support service in cooperation with Škoda. A reserve fleet of 13 old trains was preserved to be used for emergencies. No major breakdowns were reported during the winter.

In March 2024, the deadline for the delivery of all new trains was extended to the end of the summer of 2024. By the end of September, all of the 32 trains had been delivered, with Škoda incurring penalties for the delay. PV/Vivi were criticized by some as having no bicycle racks on the new trains - the first train received a bicycle rack in January 2025, with a plan to equip the rest by May.

==== Diesel and battery trains ====
In May 2020, PV announced that it would procure 8 new diesel trains to replace existing DMUs with Russian-made engines due to the addition of the manufacturers to the United States sanctions list. Five bidders applied, with three advancing to the second round in July - CAF, Pesa Bydgoszcz and Stadler Polska. PV said it planned to sign a contract by December 31.

However, this did not materialise, in part due to uncertainties concerning available funding and with the Ministry of Transport switching its focus on acquiring battery-powered trains (BEMU) by 2026, citing such upsides as a lesser impact on the environment and less noise. The ministry announced plans to order feasibility study for evaluating the technological and economic aspects of the intended purchase in the second half of 2021. The ministry added that the BEMUs would be mainly used in Riga and the Riga region.

A tender for 9 BEMU trains (with an option to purchase seven additional ones if funding is available) was announced on 13 April 2022 by the Road Transport Administration, which predicted that new units for a new Bolderāja – Riga – Sigulda line would be delivered by the end of 2026. Each train would have a capacity of 200–240 seats and the overall cost was predicted at €75-76 million, and every unit should be able to cover a distance 100 km with a single charge. The submission deadline for the first round was June, with the second round scheduled for autumn of 2022. Three bids were submitted by CAF, Škoda Transportation/Škoda Vagonka and Stadler Polska, with all advancing to the next round. However, in May 2023 it was reported by Delfi that the second round is delayed due to protracted documentation works. In September, the outgoing Minister of Transport Jānis Vitenbergs told LTV1 Panorāma news that 'everything has been prepared for the start of a tender and it just needs to be announced'. The Latvian Autotransport Directorate then announced it planned to start the tender 'in the near time'. All three bidders were later found compliant and invited to submit their bids for the second round until March 2024. In April, Škoda was declared as the winner of the second round, as Stadler were found to have faulty documentation and CAF didn't submit a bid.

January 2024 began with news that the government supported the initiative of the Ministry of Transport to purchase rolling stock of at least two new battery electric trains until December 31, 2029 for use on the Riga-Dobele line. It was also announced that the previous tender with the end goal of 2026 was still ongoing, and that these first BEMUs would start service on the Riga-Bolderāja and Riga-Sigulda routes. Public Broadcasting of Latvia also reported that there were concerns about the durabilty of train batteries during winter in the face of issues experienced by the new electric trains in early 2024.

In May 2024, PV purchased a used diesel locomotive from Estonia. Ultimately, the BEMU project stalled amid rising costs connected to the construction of the Rail Baltica project, and in September 2024 the Ministry of Transport proposed redirecting EU funding away from the battery BEMU project into the construction of the new Riga Central and Riga Airport stations. Amid other reasons specified for cancellation were the high costs and time needed to adjust infrastructure for the use of BEMUs, especially outside the Riga region, and having only one procurement finalist. The decision required approval from the Cabinet of Ministers and the European Commission. The government ultimately approved the plan to reallocate 74€ million from the Emission-Free Rail Infrastructure Development Project to Rail Baltica in February 2025, suspending the project.

However, the project was later revived and on 9 September 2025 the Cabinet of Ministers approved the decision to buy 9 BEMUs by 2029, with the required infrastructure to be built in parallel. The trains are planned to run on the routes from Rīga to Cēsis and from Rīga to Daugavpils, where there is no infrastructure for electric trains. On 11 December 2025, a contract was signed with Škoda Group for the purchase of 9 battery electric trains, with an option to purchase 7 more trains. The contract amount is 89,409,387 euros, and the delivery of the trains is planned by 2029.

== Rail Baltica ==
On March 18, 2026, ViVi, in cooperation with the Estonian passenger train operator Elron and the Lithuanian passenger train operator LTG Link, announced a framework procurement for Rail Baltica regional passenger trains. The procurement will involve the procurement of Rail Baltica European standard gauge trains with a speed of up to 200 km/h. The trains will have at least 200 seats, standard and business class; a quiet area; a family area; an area for animals. In addition, catering with a coffee machine, 2 toilets; high-speed internet (5G); 4 wheelchair spaces and 20 bicycle racks. Latvia plans to purchase 5 train sets

== See also ==
- Latvian Railways
- Elron (rail transit) - Estonian passenger rail operator
- LTG Link - Lithuanian passenger rail operator
- Rail Baltica
