= Kalngale Station =

Railway station in Latvia

Kalngale
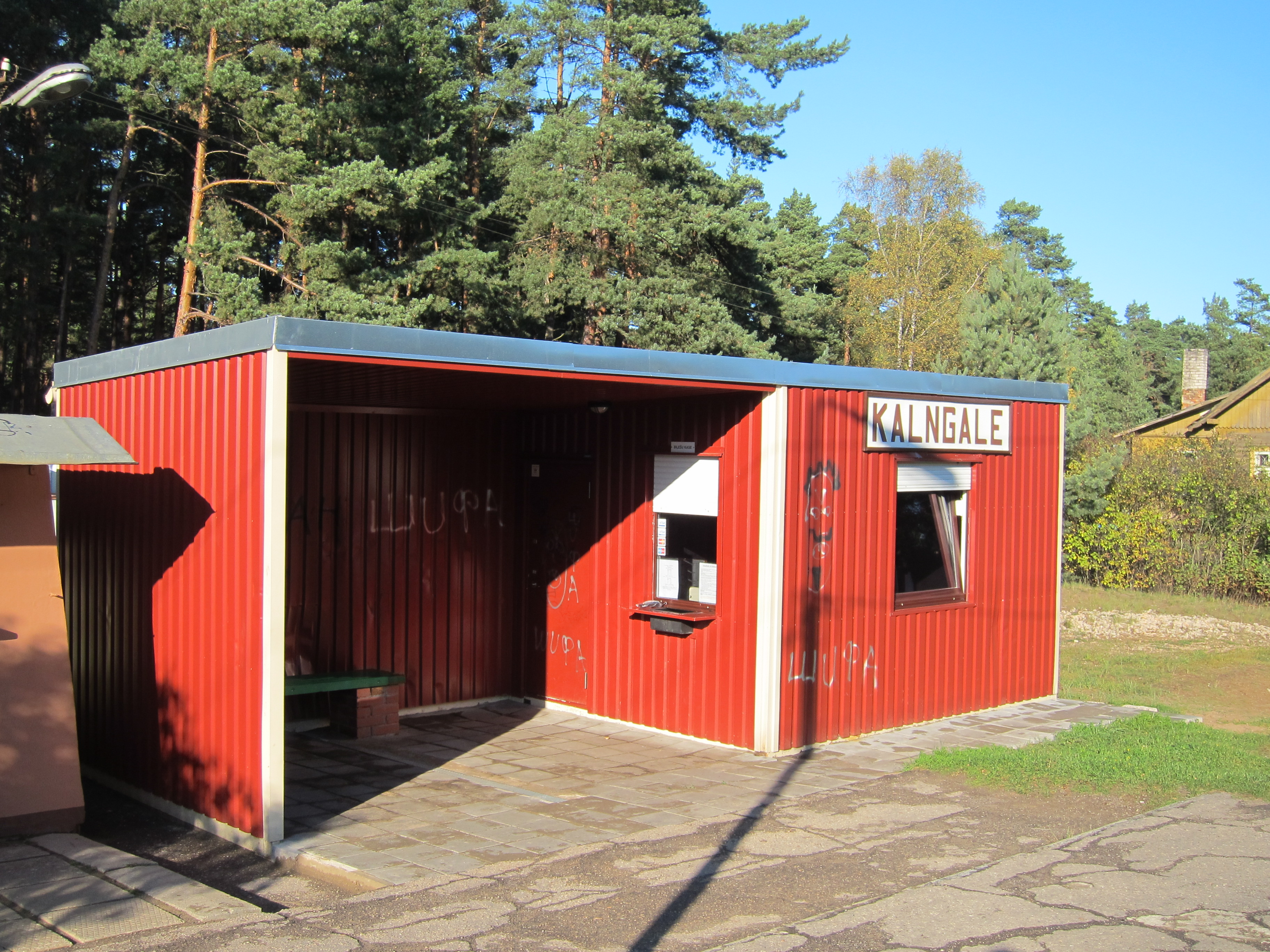
- Station building

General information
- Location: Kalngale, Carnikava Parish, Ādaži Municipality
- Coordinates: 57°5′11.71″N 24°9′9.12″E
- Platforms: 2
- Tracks: 2

Construction
- Parking: 50+ spaces

History
- Opened: 1933

Services
Preceding station	LDz	Following station
Vecāķi towards Riga	Riga–Skulte Railway	Garciems towards Skulte
Location

Kalngale Station is a railway station on the Zemitāni–Skulte Railway in the village of Kalngale, Carnikava Parish, Ādaži Municipality.
