= Sarkandaugava Station =

Railway station on the Zemitāni–Skulte Railway in Latvia

Sarkandaugava
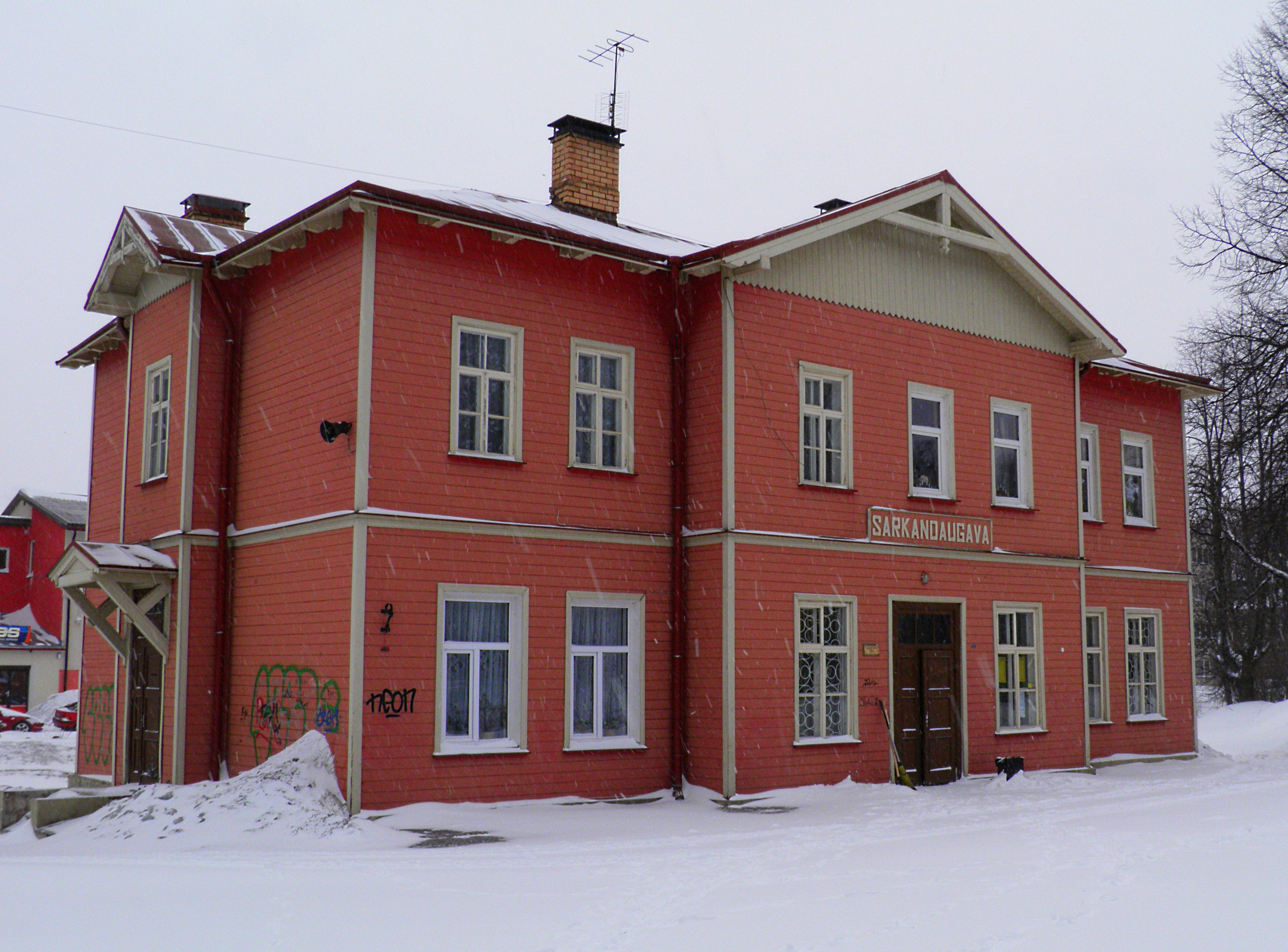

General information
- Location: Sliežu street 2, Riga
- Coordinates: 56°59′33.56″N 24°8′4.08″E
- Platforms: 2
- Tracks: 3

History
- Opened: 1872
- Rebuilt: 1925
- Former names: Aleksandra Augstumi

Services
Preceding station	LDz	Following station
Brasa towards Riga	Riga–Skulte Railway	Mangaļi towards Skulte
Location

Sarkandaugava Station is a railway station on the Zemitāni–Skulte Railway, in Sarkandaugava neighbourhood of Riga, Latvia.
