= Vecdaugava Station =

Railway stop in Riga, Latvia

Vecdaugava
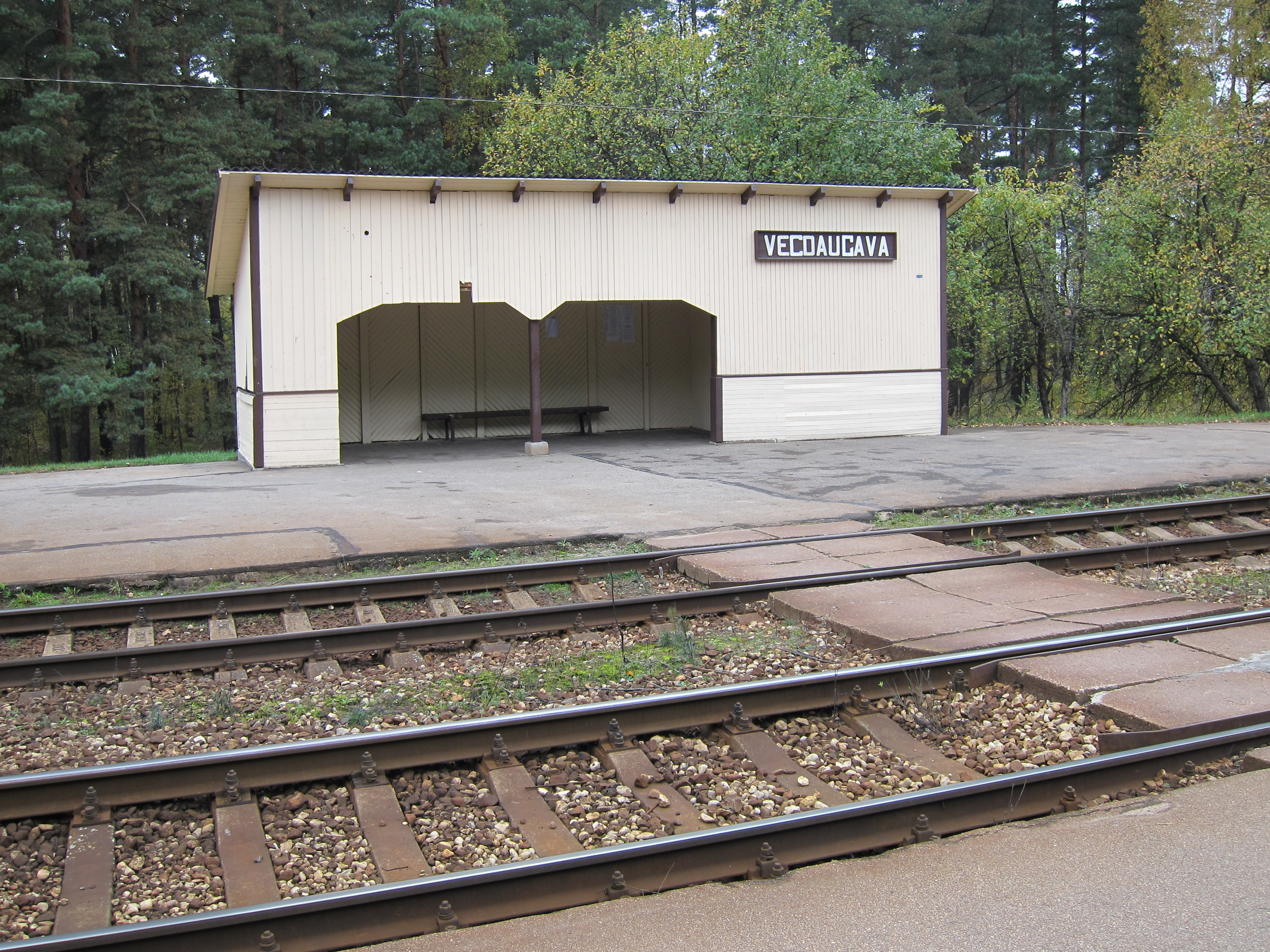

General information
- Location: Vecdaugava, Riga
- Coordinates: 57°3′24.80″N 24°6′24.74″E
- Platforms: 2
- Tracks: 2

History
- Opened: 1964

Services
Preceding station	LDz	Following station
Ziemeļblāzma towards Riga	Riga–Skulte Railway	Vecāķi towards Skulte
Location

Vecdaugava Station is a railway stop on the Zemitāni–Skulte Railway.
