= Garupe Station =

Railway station in Latvia

Garupe
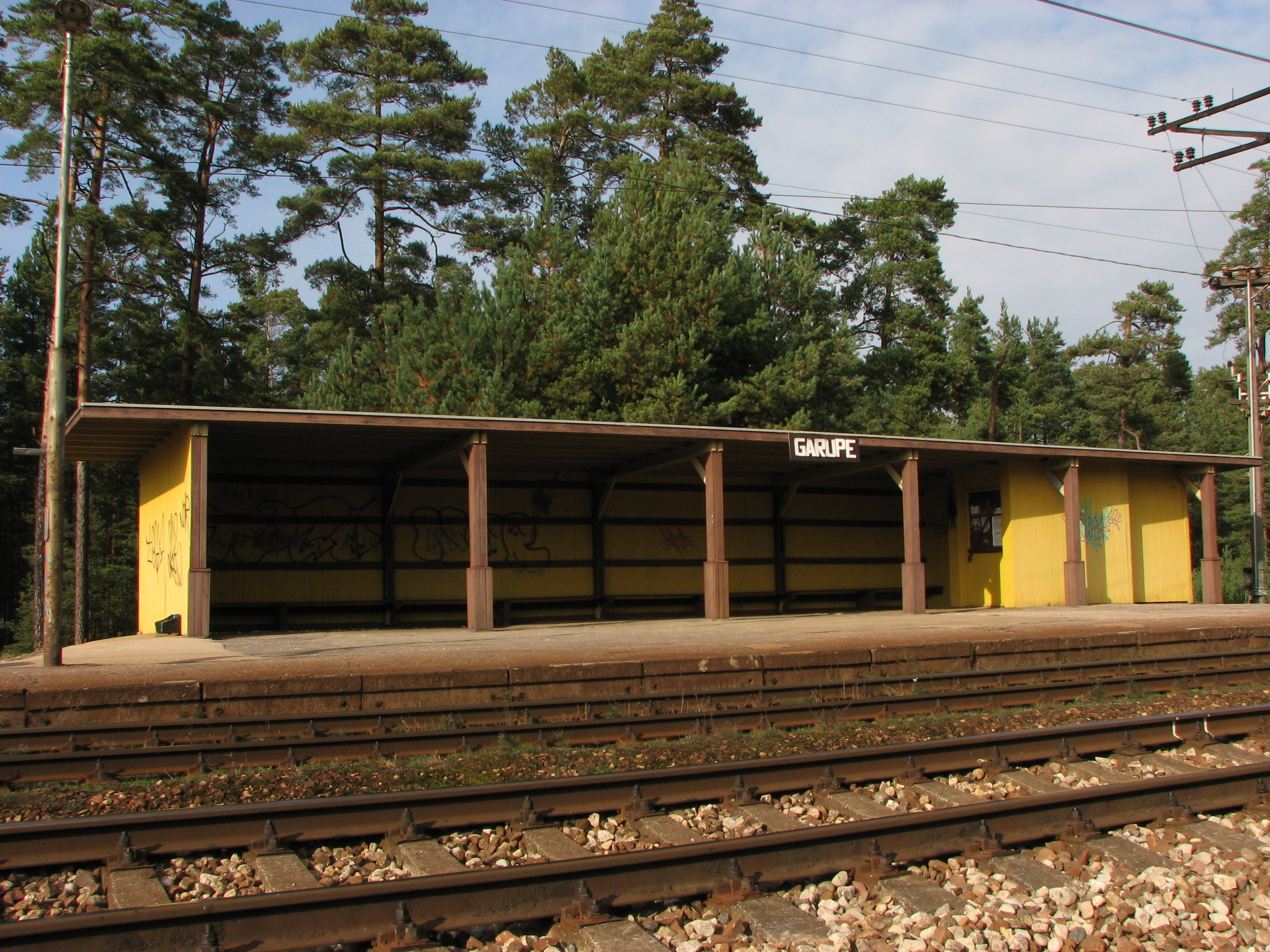
- Garupe station in 2016

General information
- Location: Garupe, Carnikava Municipality
- Coordinates: 57°6′51.07″N 24°14′42.21″E
- Platforms: 2
- Tracks: 2

Services
Preceding station	LDz	Following station
Garciems towards Riga	Riga–Skulte Railway	Carnikava towards Skulte
Location

Garupe Station is a railway station on the Zemitāni – Skulte Railway.
