= Vecāķi Station =

Railway station on the Zemitāni–Skulte Railway in Latvia

Vecāķi
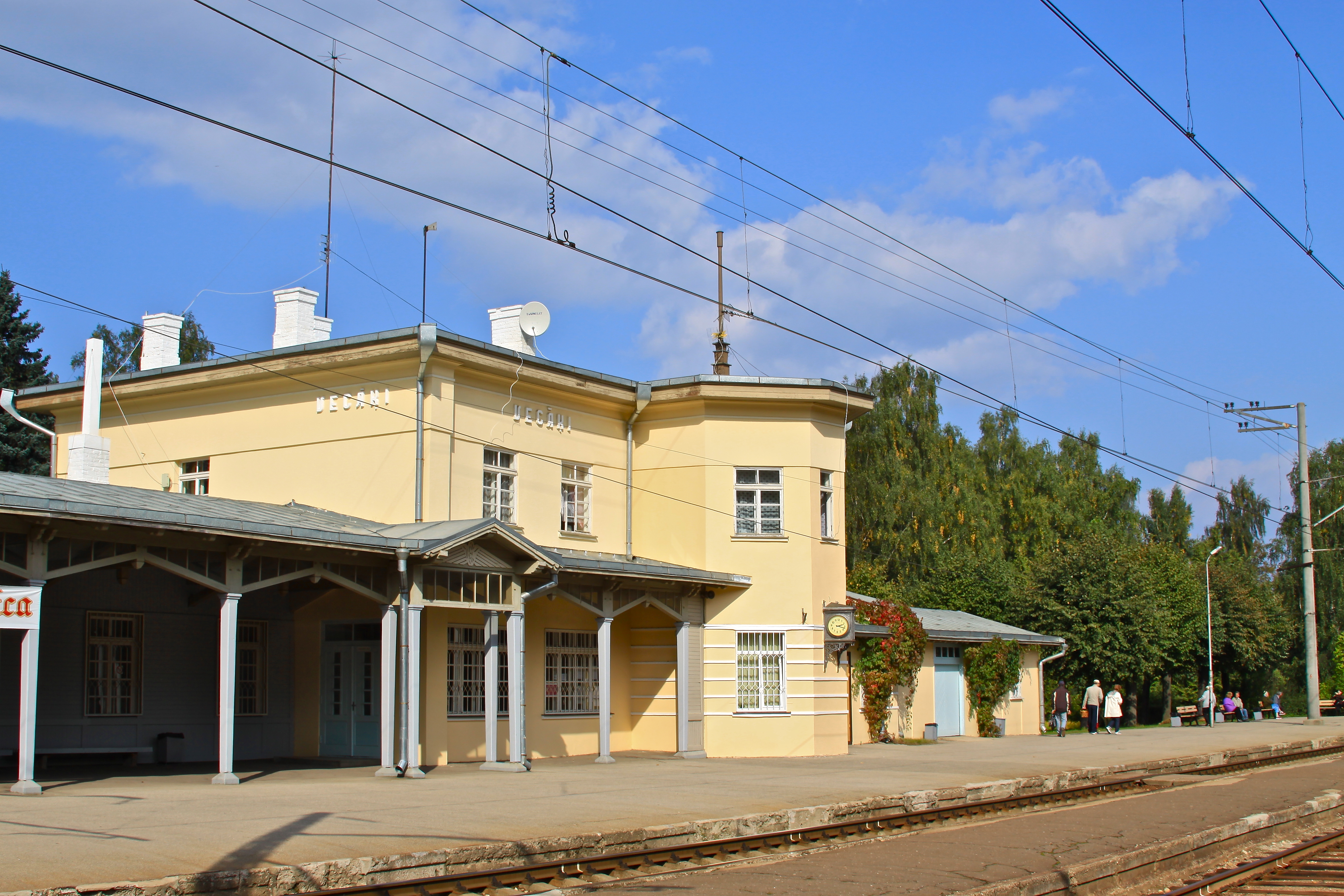

General information
- Location: Vecāķi prospect 1a, Riga
- Coordinates: 57°4′28.22″N 24°6′53.47″E
- Platforms: 3
- Tracks: 3

History
- Opened: 1933

Services
Preceding station	LDz	Following station
Vecdaugava towards Riga	Riga–Skulte Railway	Kalngale towards Skulte
Location

Vecāķi Station is a railway station on the Zemitāni – Skulte Railway.
