= Brasa Station =

Railway station in Latvia

Brasa
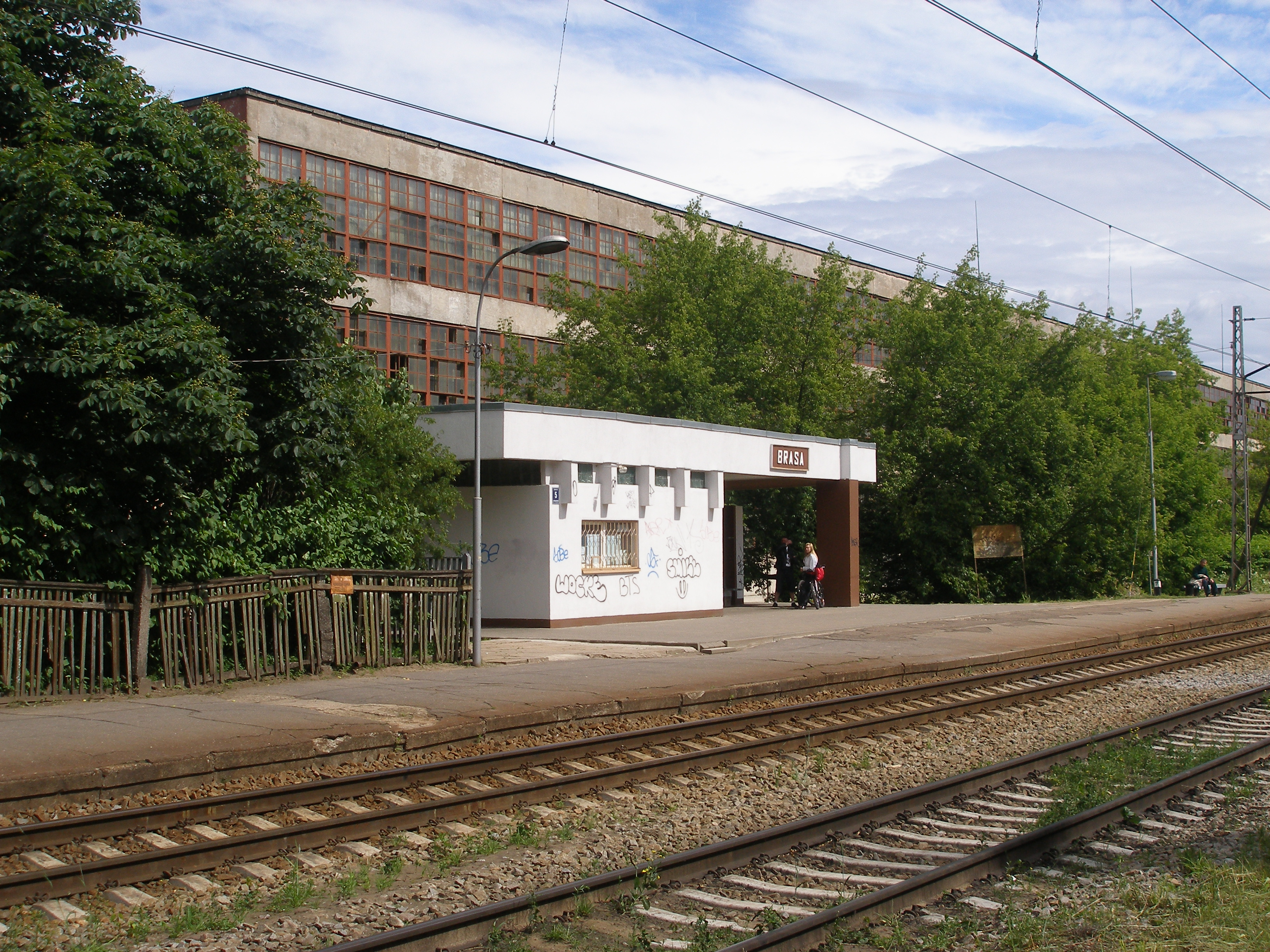

General information
- Location: Laktas street 5, Riga
- Coordinates: 56°58′39.0″N 24°8′47.6″E
- Line: Zemitāni–Skulte Railway
- Platforms: 2
- Tracks: 2

History
- Opened: 1872
- Former names: Kara hospitālis

Services
Preceding station	LDz	Following station
Zemitāni towards Riga	Riga–Skulte Railway	Sarkandaugava towards Skulte
Location

Brasa Station is a railway stop on the Zemitāni–Skulte Railway.
