= Garciems Station =

Railway station in Latvia

Garciems
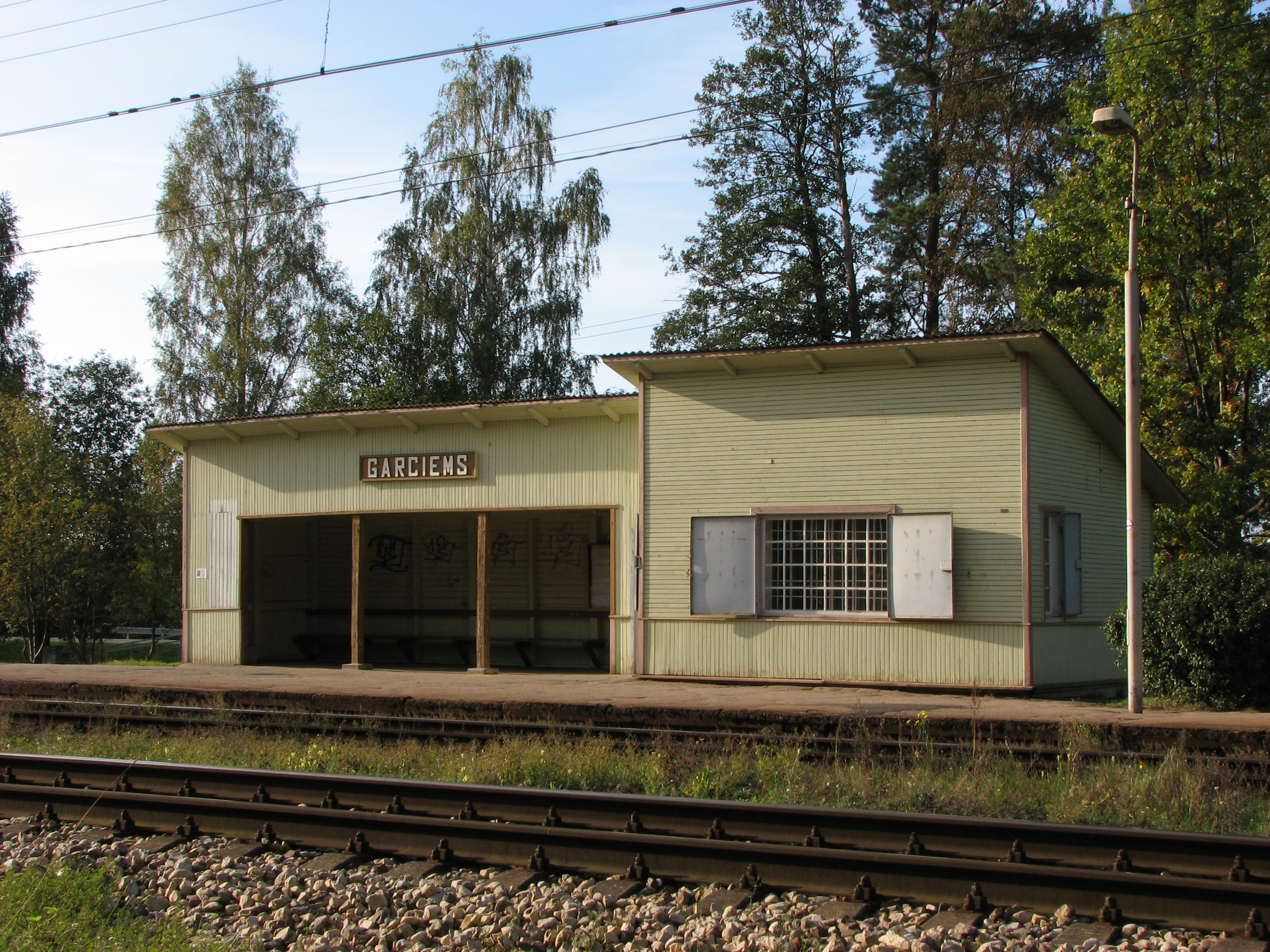
- Garciems station in 2016

General information
- Location: Garciems, Carnikava Municipality
- Coordinates: 57°6′7.02″N 24°12′19.31″E
- Platforms: 2
- Tracks: 2

Construction
- Parking: 30 spaces

History
- Opened: 1933

Services
Preceding station	LDz	Following station
Kalngale towards Riga	Riga–Skulte Railway	Garupe towards Skulte
Location

Garciems Station is a railway station on the Zemitāni – Skulte Railway in Latvia.
