= Mangaļi Station =

Railway station on the Zemitāni–Skulte Railway in Latvia

Mangaļi
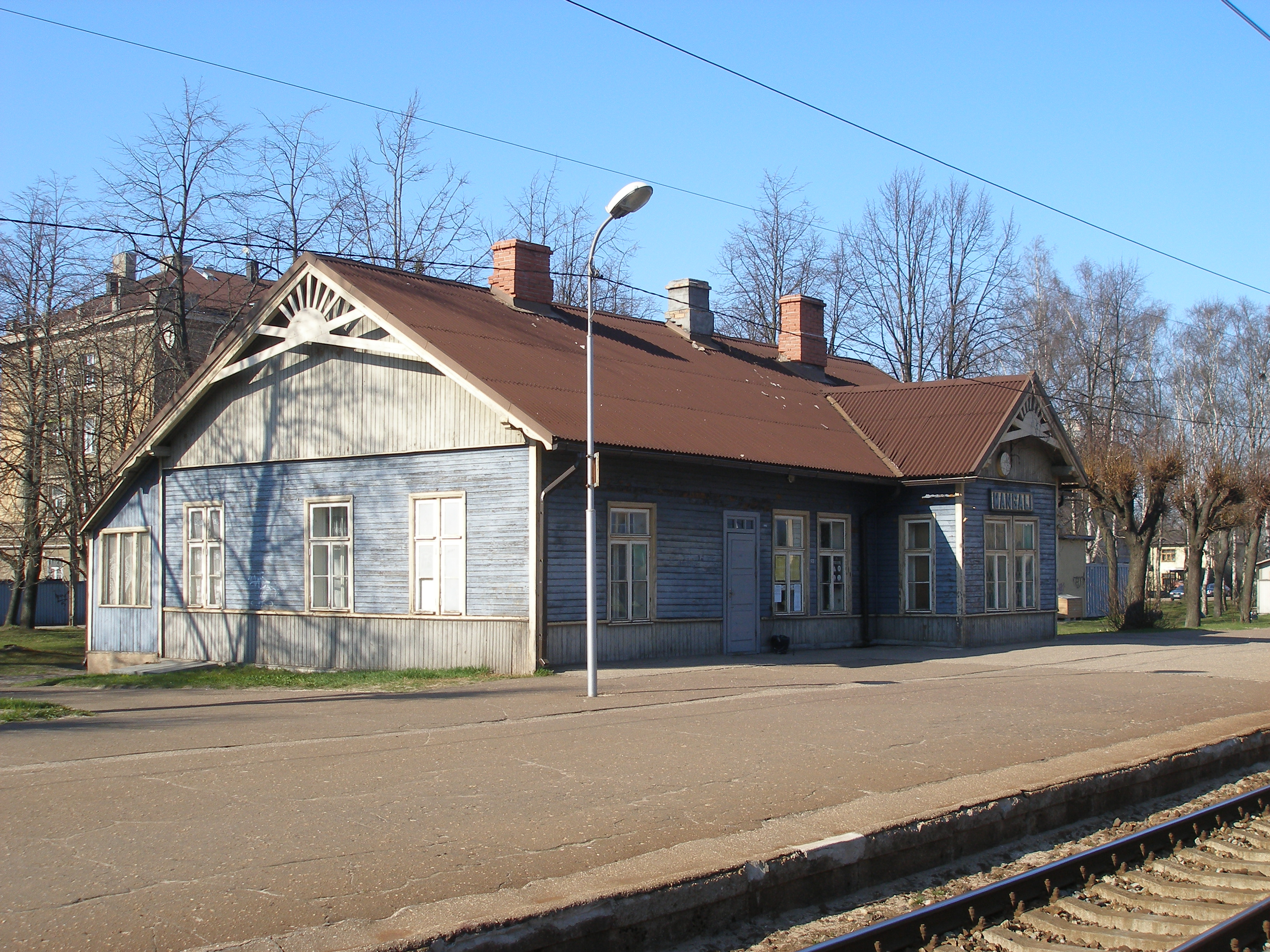

General information
- Location: Vitrupes street 2, Riga
- Coordinates: 57°1′6.19″N 24°7′46.62″E
- Platforms: 2
- Tracks: 12

History
- Opened: 1872
- Former names: Mīlgrāvis

Services
Preceding station	LDz	Following station
Sarkandaugava towards Riga	Riga–Skulte Railway	Ziemeļblāzma towards Skulte
Location

Mangaļi Station is a railway station on the Zemitāni–Skulte Railway.
