= Brasa =

Brasa may refer to:

- Brasa, Riga, a neighbourhood of Riga, Latvia
- Team Brasa, a Brazilian jiu-jitsu competition team
- Jose Brasa, a Spanish born India men's national field hockey team coach
- Brasa Building, on the list of landmarks in Seattle
- Brasa Futebol Clube, Brazilian football club
- Brasa (leafhopper) Oman, 1938, an insect genus in the tribe Agalliini
