= Daugavgrīva White Church =

Church building in Riga, Latvia

- Daugavgrīvas Baltā baznīca
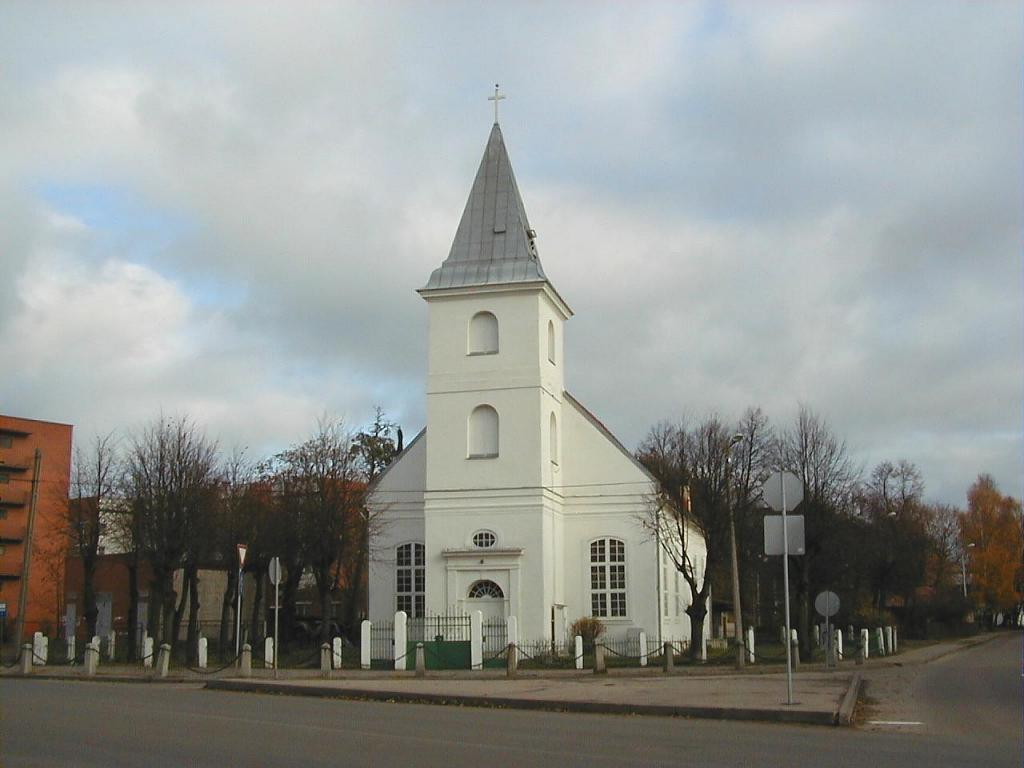
- Daugavgrīva White Church in 2002
- Daugavgrīva White Church
- 57°2′11.99″N 24°5′14.33″E
- Location: Riga
- Country: Latvia
- Denomination: Lutheran

Daugavgrīva White Church (Latvian: Daugavgrīvas Baltā baznīca) is a Lutheran church in the Vecmīlgrāvis district of Riga, the capital of Latvia. It is a parish church of the Evangelical Lutheran Church of Latvia. The church is situated at the address 50 Baltāsbaznīcas iela.

== History ==
The church was built at the very end of the eighteenth century, although there was probably an earlier church on the site. Its name "white church" is derived from its white-painted wooden construction. Situated beside the river, closer to the sea than the Riga city centre, it was for many years considered "the fishermen's church". Local tradition suggests that the tower was built to serve also as a lighthouse, although no evidence supports the claim; it is more likely simply to have been used by seafarers as a fixed point of reference for navigation.
