= Zemitāni Station =

Railway station in Riga, Latvia

Zemitāni
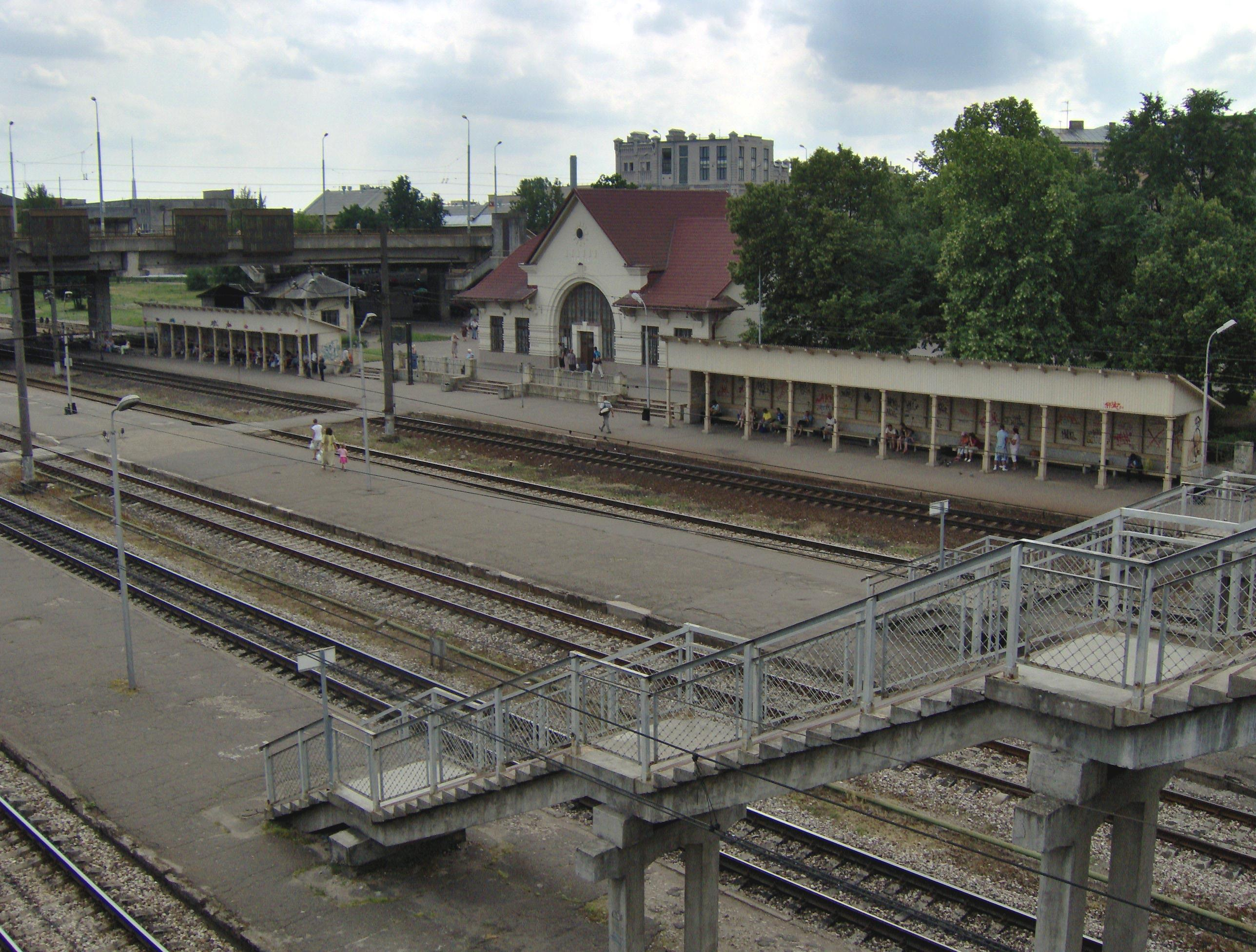
- Zemitāni Station

General information
- Coordinates: 56°57′55.81″N 24°9′22.72″E
- Platforms: 5
- Tracks: 15
- Connections: bus, trolleybus

History
- Opened: 1872
- Electrified: 3 kV DC
- Former names: Aleksandra Vārti, Zemitāni, Riga-Hohe Brücke, Oškalni

Services
Preceding station	LDz	Following station
Riga Terminus	Riga–Skulte Railway	Brasa towards Skulte
Riga Terminus	Riga–Lugaži	Čiekurkalns towards Lugaži
Location

Zemitāni Station is a railway station in Riga, Latvia on the Riga–Skulte and Riga–Lugaži railway lines.

== History ==
Initially the station was called Aleksandra Vārti (Alexander Gate), after adjacent Arch of Alexander I. This name is known since at least 1889. It was renamed in 1928 in honor of Colonel Jorģis Zemitāns, the commander of the Latvian Northern Brigade during the Latvian War of Independence.

During the Nazi occupation of Latvia, the station carried the name Riga-Hohe Brücke (Riga-High Bridge). Following the re-occupation of Latvia by the Soviet Union in 1944, it carried the name Oškalni, in memory of pro-Soviet partisan Otomārs Oškalns. In 1991, after the restoration of Latvian independence, the name Zemitāni was restored.
