= Brasa, Riga =

Neighbourhood of Riga, Latvia

Brasa
- Neighbourhood of Riga
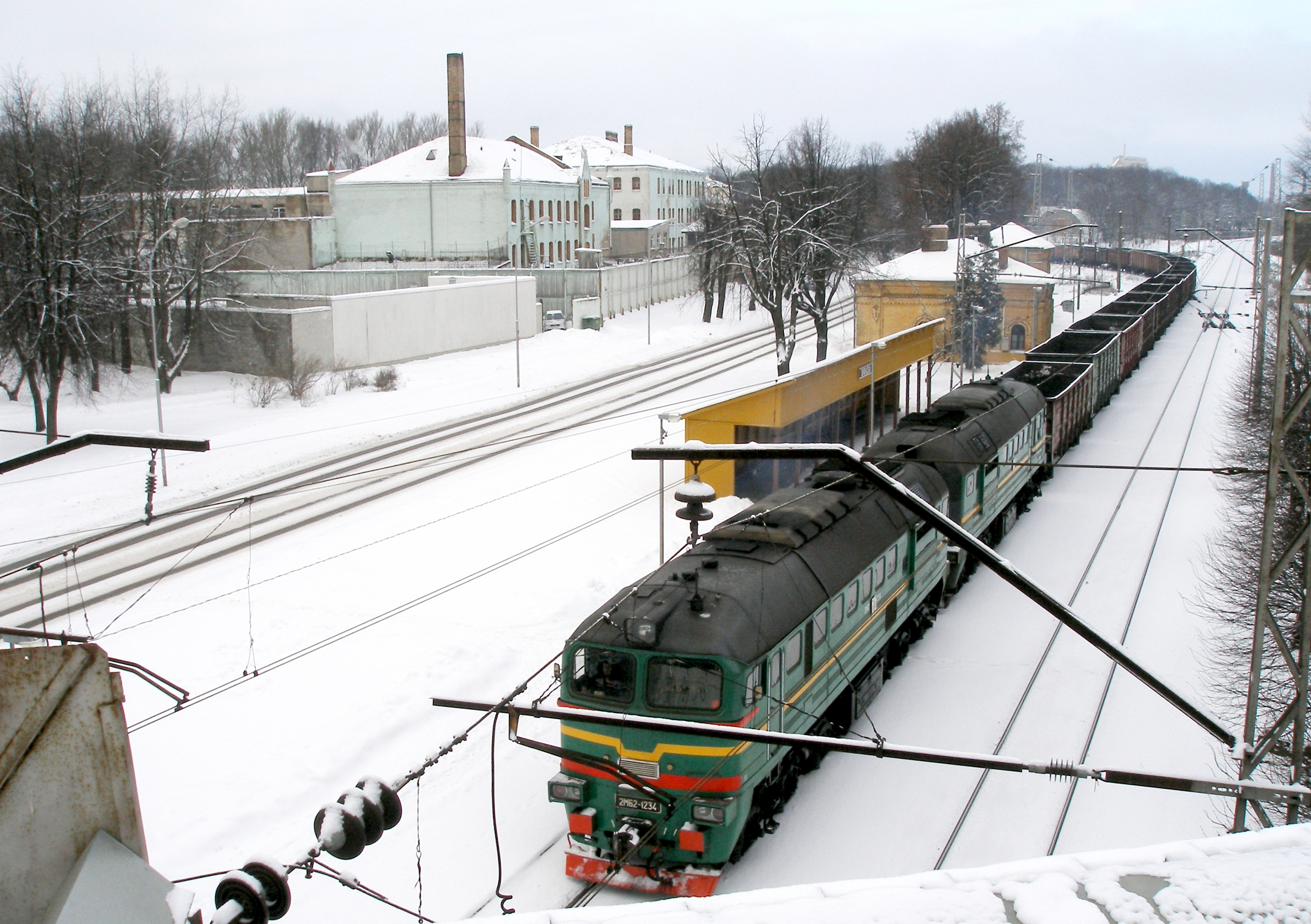
- Brasa railway station and former Brasa Prison

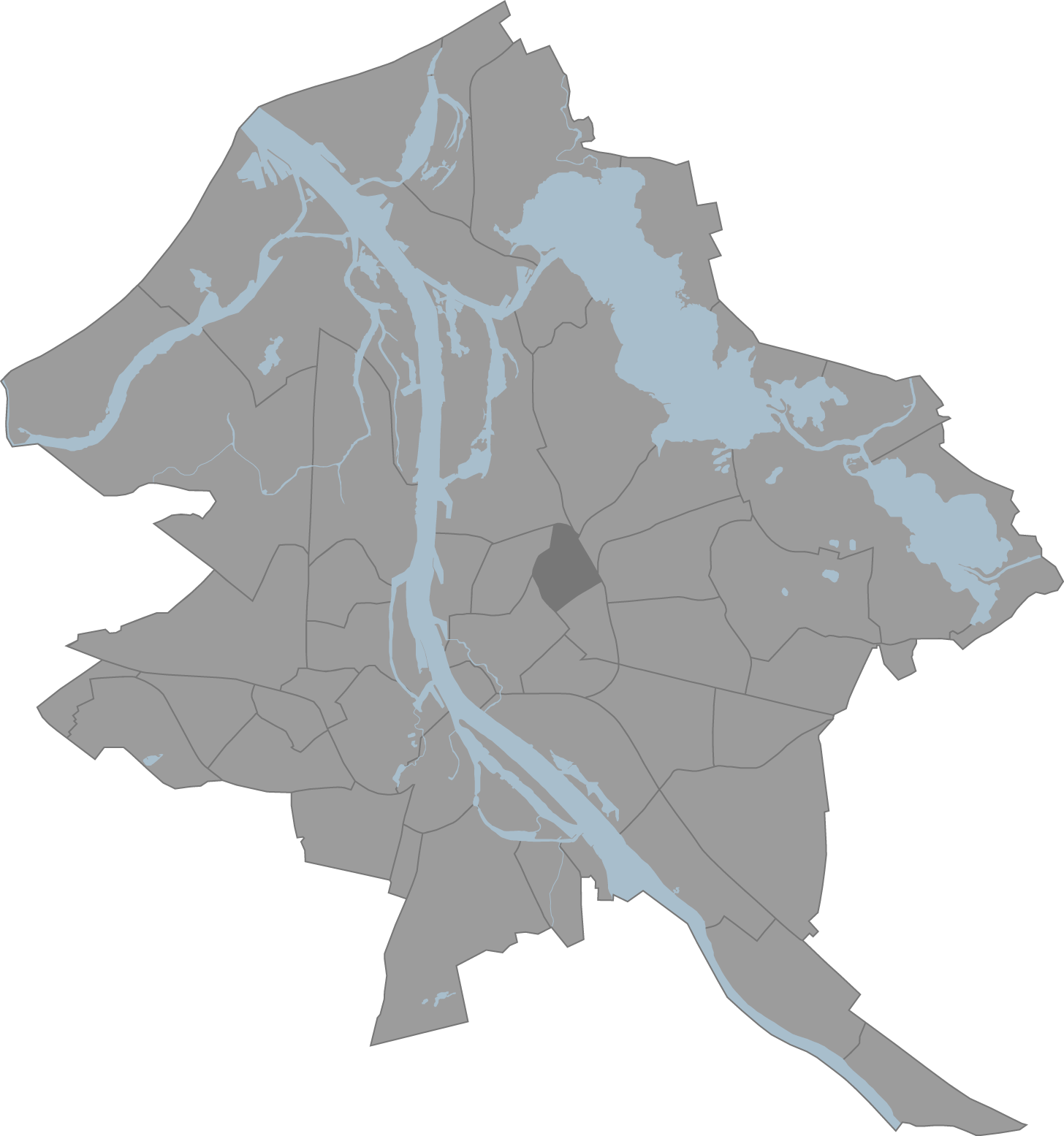
- Location of Brasa in Riga

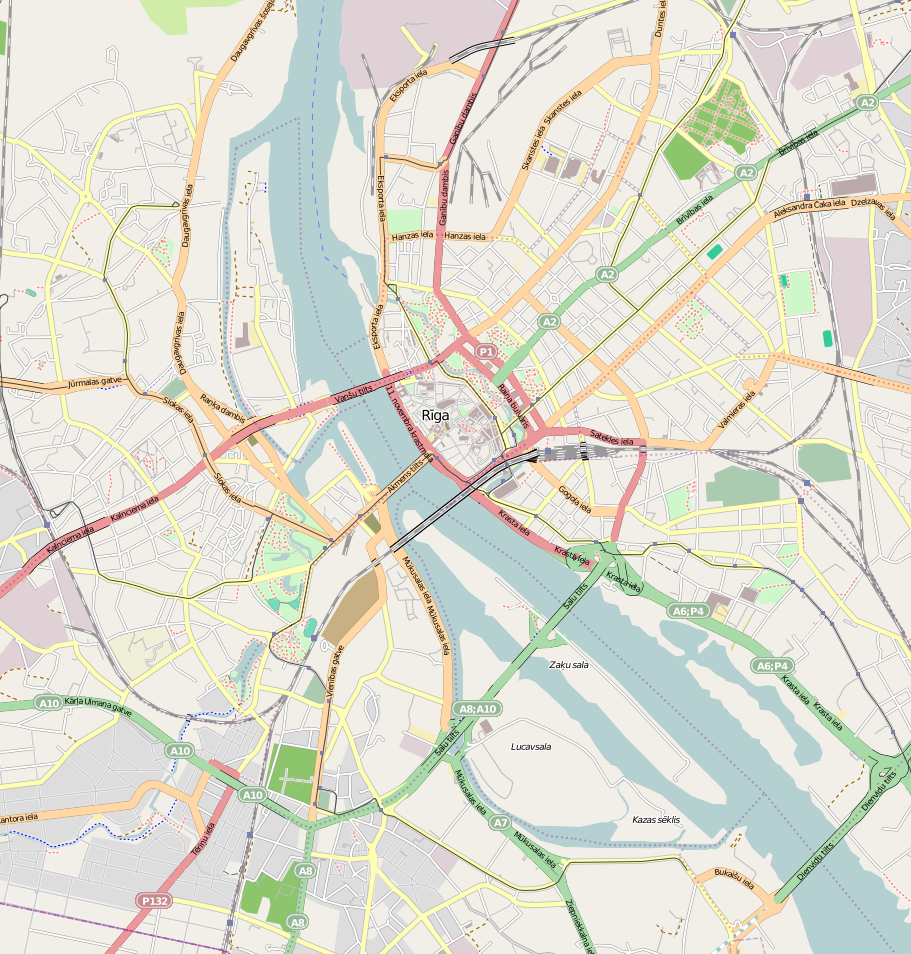
- Location within Riga
- Coordinates: 56°58′19″N 24°08′29″E
- Country: Latvia
- City: Riga
- District: Vidzeme Suburb

Area
  - Total: 1.741 km^{2} (0.672 sq mi)

Population (2024)
  - Total: 12,604
  - Density: 7,240/km^{2} (18,750/sq mi)
- Website: apkaimes.lv

Brasa is a neighbourhood of Riga, the capital of Latvia.

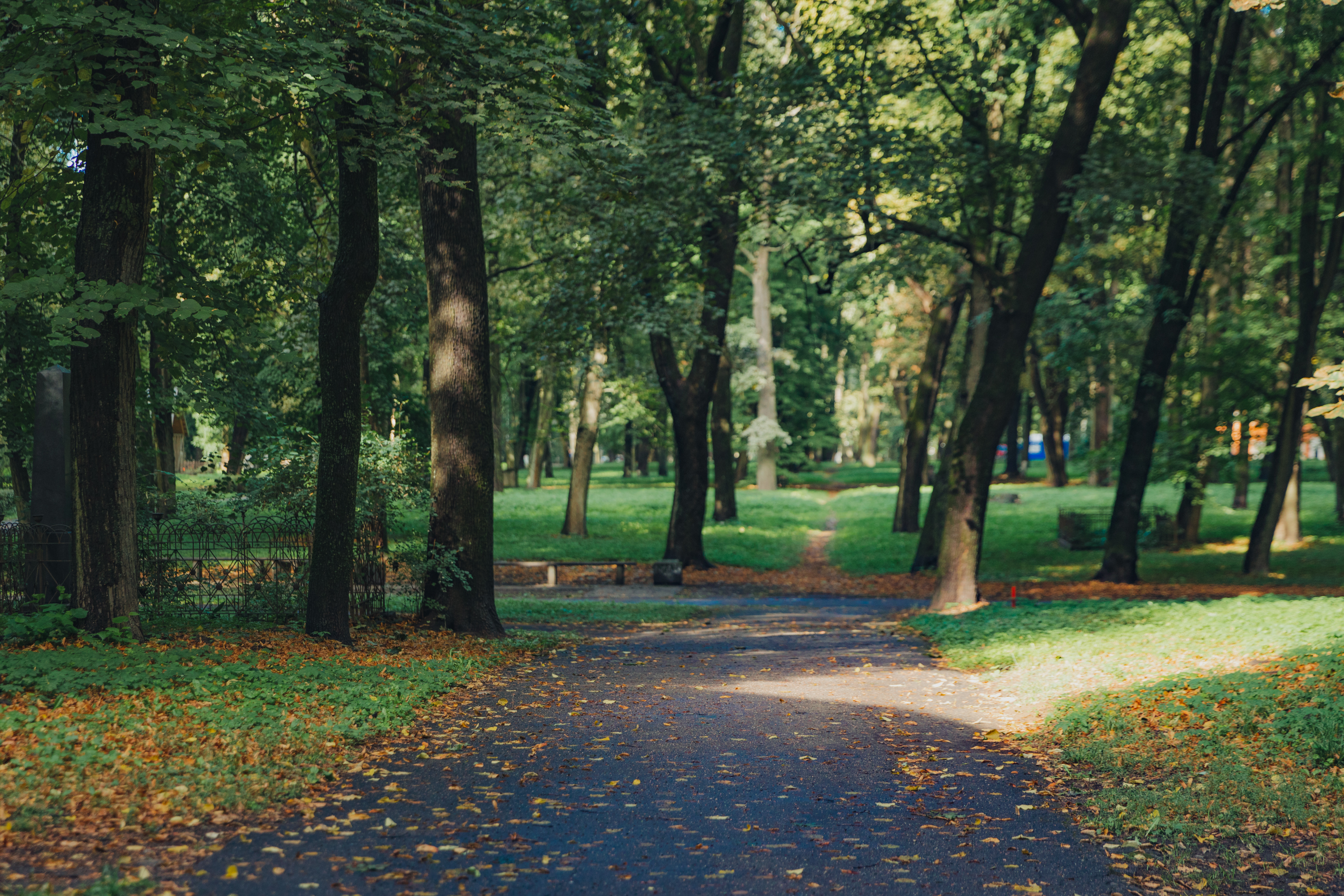
Great Cemetery park

== See also ==
- Great Cemetery (Riga)
