= Vecmīlgrāvis =

Neighborhood of Riga, Latvia

Coordinates: 57°02′N 24°06′E

- Neighborhood of Riga
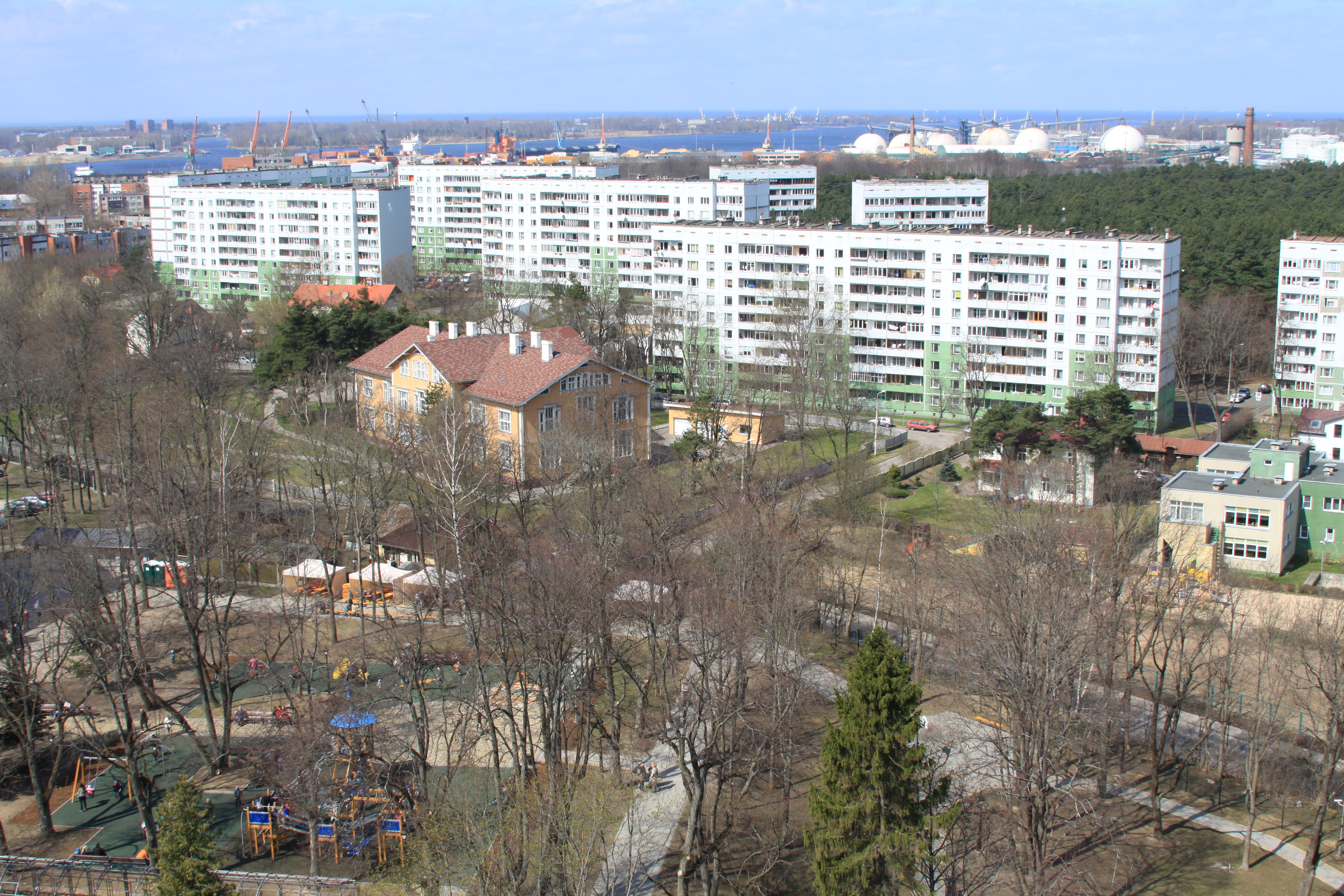
- Vecmīlgrāvis skyline with the Freeport of Riga in background

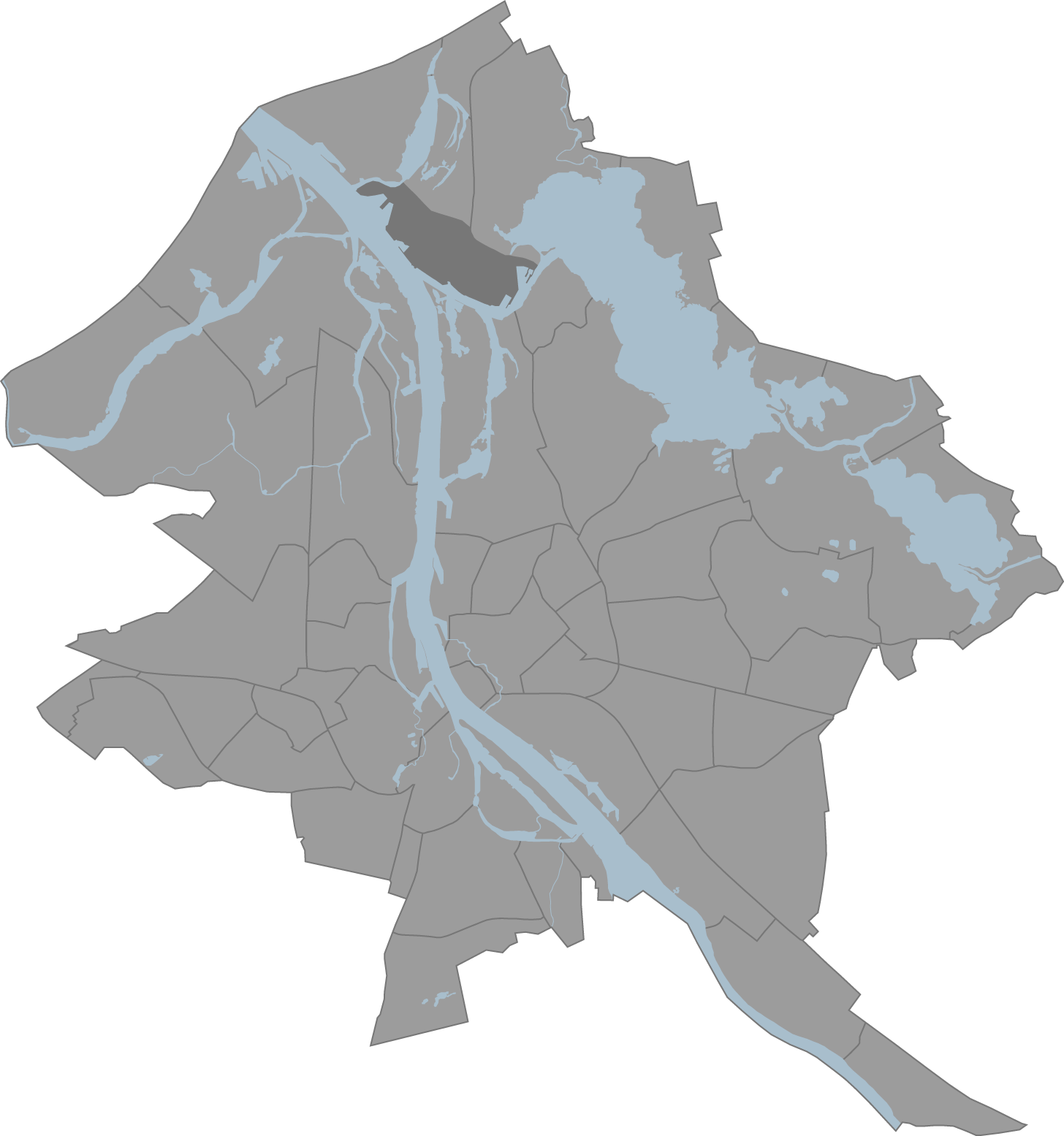
- Location in Riga
- Country: Latvia
- City: Riga
- District: Northern District

Area
  - Total: 6,073 km^{2} (2,345 sq mi)

Population (2025)
  - Total: 18,930
  - Density: 3.117/km^{2} (8.073/sq mi)
- Time zone: UTC+2 (EET)
  - Summer (DST): UTC+3 (EEST)
- Website: apkaimes.lv

Vecmīlgrāvis is a neighbourhood in Riga, the capital of Latvia, located in the northern part of the city, about 12–14 km from the city centre.

From 1203 until 1305 the present Vecmīlgrāvis territory belonged to the Daugavgrīva Abbey. In 1305 the abbey was sold to the Livonian Order and later it was included in the estate of Mangaļi manor. In 1922 Vecmīlgrāvis was included in the territory of Riga, but physical integration with the city occurred after 1934 when the bridge over the Mīlgrāvis Canal was built.
