= Riga Central Station =

Rail station in Latvia

Coordinates: 56.947222°N 24.122222°E

Rīgas Centrālā stacija
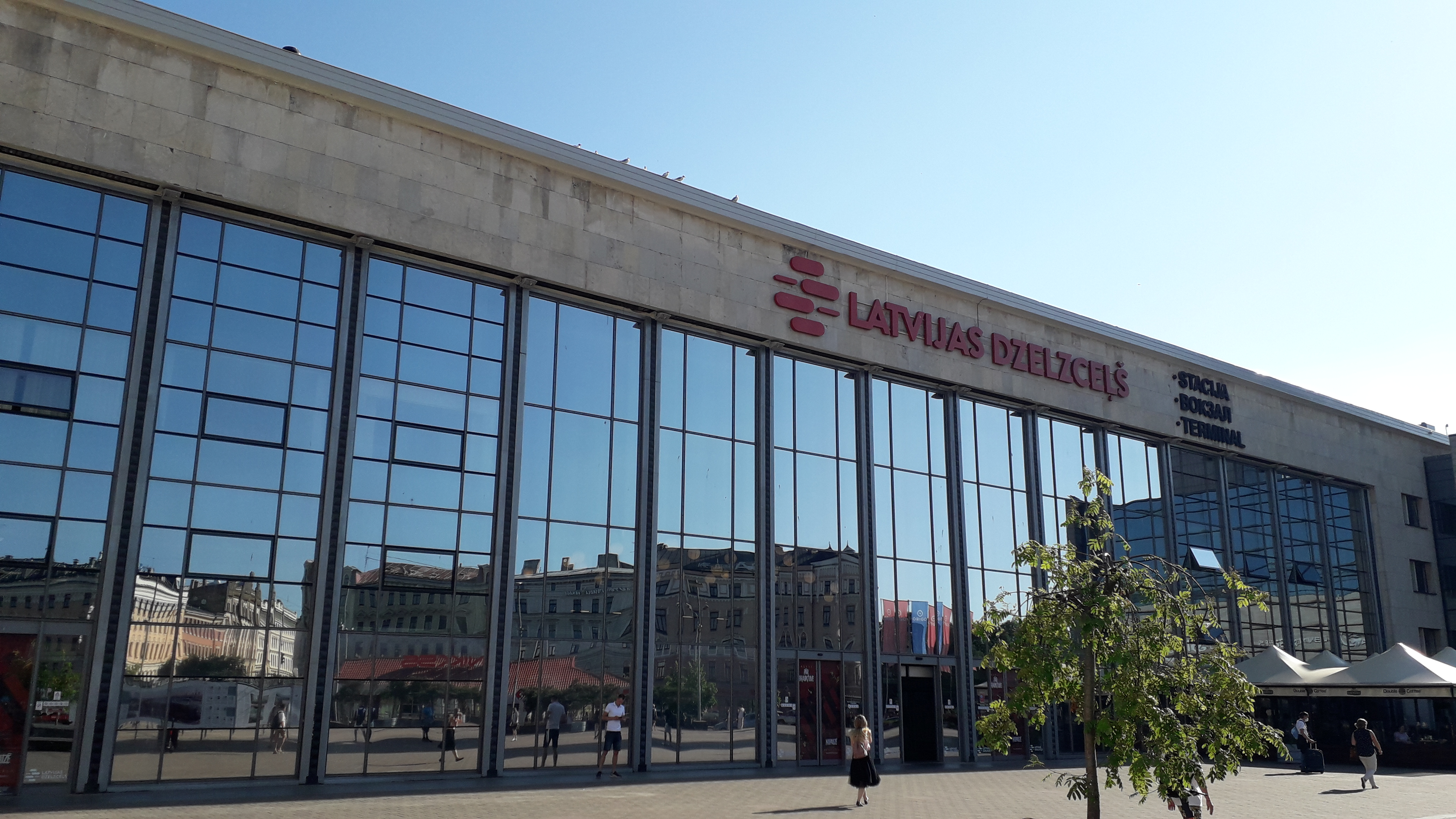

General information
- Other names: Rīgas Pasažieru stacija
- Location: Stacijas laukums 2 Centra rajons, Rīga LV-1050; Latvia
- Owner: Latvian Railways
- Lines: Riga–Tukums; Riga–Jelgava; Riga–Daugavpils; Riga–Lugaži; Riga–Skulte
- Platforms: 5
- Tracks: 12
- Train operators: Vivi
- Connections: bus, trolleybus

History
- Opened: 1861

Services
Preceding station	LDz	Following station
Torņakalns towards Tukums II	Torņakalns–Tukums II Railway	Terminus
Torņakalns towards Jelgava	Riga–Jelgava	Terminus
Terminus	Riga–Skulte Railway	Zemitāni towards Skulte
Terminus	Riga–Lugaži	Zemitāni towards Lugaži
Terminus	Riga–Daugavpils	Vagonu Parks towards Daugavpils
Preceding station	LTG Link	Following station
Jelgava towards Vilnius	Vilnius—Riga	Terminus
Vilnius Terminus	Vilnius—Riga—Tallinn	Valga, Estonia towards Tallinn, Estonia
Future services
Preceding station	Rail Baltica	Following station
Riga Airport	Rail Baltica	Pärnu towards Tallinn, Estonia
Panevėžys	Rail Baltica	Pärnu towards Tallinn, Estonia
Location

Riga Central Station (Latvian: Rīgas Centrālā stacijа) is the main railway station in Riga, Latvia. It is known as the main point of Riga due to its central location, and most forms of public transport stop in this area. Part of the building is a shopping centre.

Three rail mainlines connect the station to the east:

- Riga–Skulte
- Riga–Lugaži, through to the Estonian border crossing at Valka
- Riga–Krustpils, which then splits into lines to Daugavpils and Zilupe.

Two rail mainlines connect the station to the west:

- Riga–Jelgava, including lines through to Liepāja.
- Riga–Tukums.

== Services ==
- Trains on the Riga–Skulte line run to the stations of Carnikava, Saulkrasti, and Skulte 1-2 times per hour. All trains are electric.
- Trains on the Riga-Valga (Riga–Lugaži) railway line run every 1–2 hours to Sigulda, 4-6 times per day to Valmiera, and twice a day to Valga in Estonia. All trains are diesel.
- Trains on the Riga-Krustpils line run more than 3 times per hour to Ogre and Lielvarde, and least once per hour to Aizkraukle, where the Electric trains stop. Diesel trains run to Madona once per day, and to Gulbene via Madona on Fridays, Saturdays, and Sundays. One train per day goes to Krustpils, however two trains a day to Zilupe, one to Rezekne, four to Daugavpils, a Sunday trip Livani-Riga in the summer, and one to Kraslava or Indra depending on the day also serve the station. The train line Riga-Daugavpils-Aglona runs once per year.
- Trains to Jelgava run every hour or so as electrics, but there are 8 trains per week to Liepāja, and as of December 27, 2023, one to Vilnius.
- Trains to Tukums II via Jurmala run frequently, with frequencies lessening after Sloka. Trains along the line to Ventspils were cancelled in 2010.

== History ==
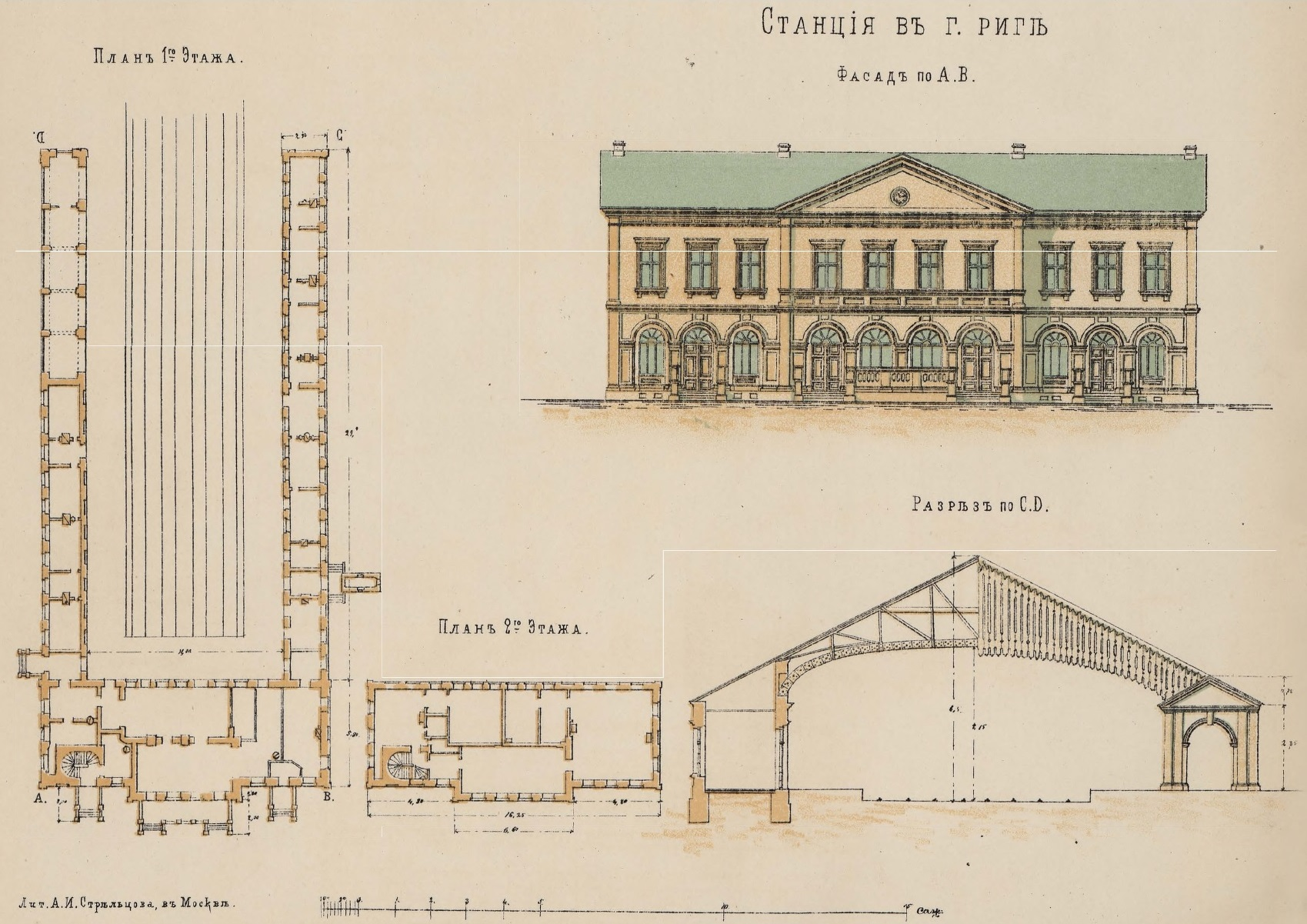
Architectural drawing from 1872 of the first station building.

The first railway station in Riga was constructed to serve as the western terminal station of the new railway line from Riga to Daugavpils which was financed by British contractors and led by British engineers. Construction of the station started in 1858, and the ceremony of laying the foundation stone on 21 May 1858 was attended by the Governor-General of the Baltic provinces Alexander Arkadyevich Suvorov. The station opened on 12 October 1861 along with the railway line, which connected Riga with Daugavpils and the Saint Petersburg–Warsaw railway line. The station building was designed by the architect Johann Felsko, and was a small building on two floors with two platforms and four tracks. In addition to railway facilities it also housed a telegraph office, a post office and a police station.

In 1868, the railway line from Riga to Jelgava opened, initially terminating at Torņakalns railway station on the west bank of the river Daugava. From 1872, however, all trains were continued from there via the Iron Bridge across the Daugava to the Riga II Station.

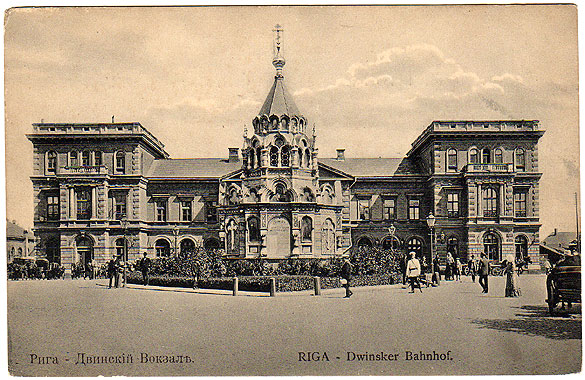
The Dvinsk station after the expansion of 1885 with the chapel in front of the station building.

Due to the further expansion of the railway network, the old building became too small, and in 1885 the station was rebuilt and expanded with two large side wings following the project of the architect Heinrich Scheel. In 1889, a Neo-Byzantine style chapel was also built in front of the railway station to commemorate the miraculous survival of Emperor Alexander III and his family at the Borki train disaster in 1888.

Two separate stations were in operation in 19th century — one serving the line to Daugavpils and the other towards Jūrmala. They were joined and reconstructed in 1914 and functioned until the 1960s. In 1960 the current station building was opened and in 1965 — a second one. During the years, the station saw many reconstructions.

== Future developments ==
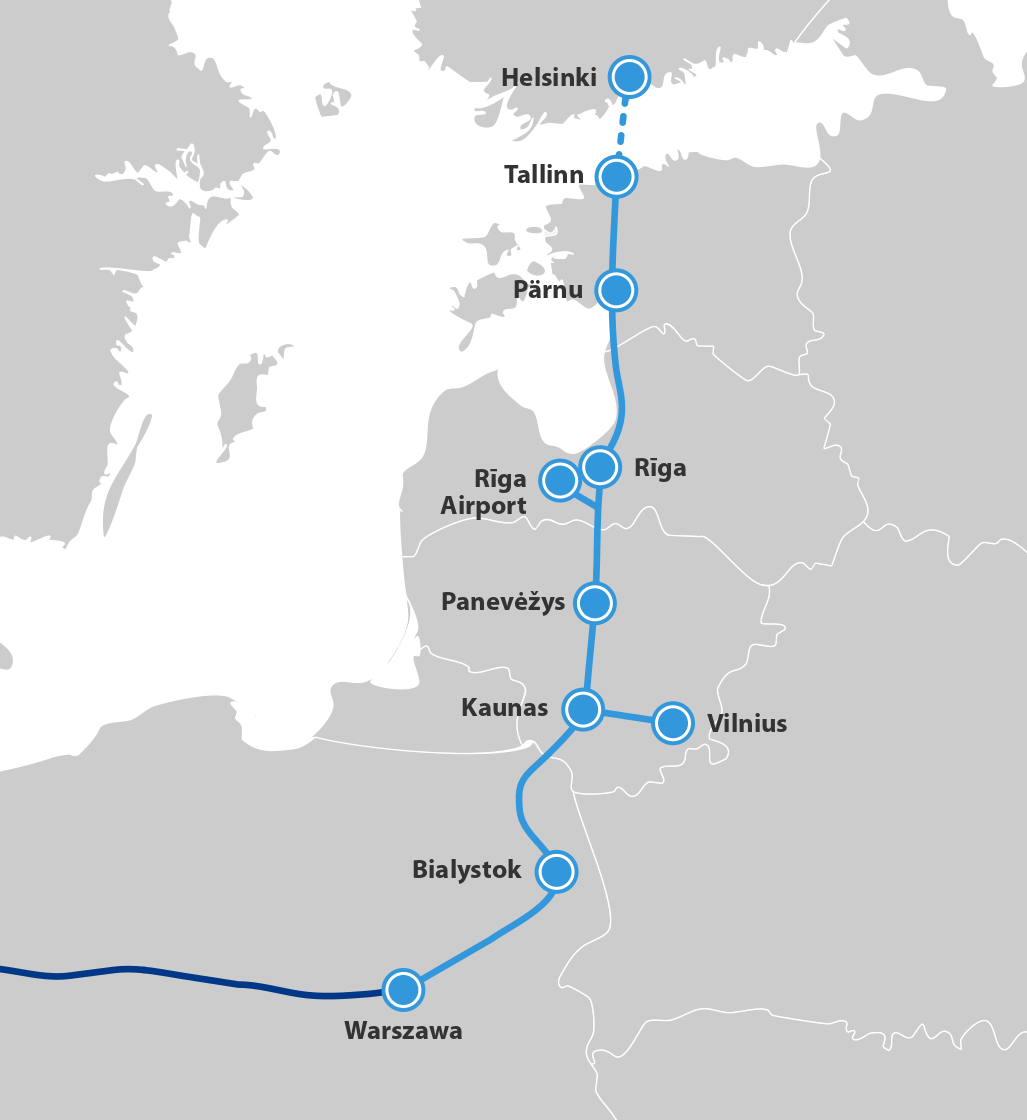

There are plans to completely remodel the station in conjunction with the Rail Baltica project. A design by Danish architectural firms PLH Architects and COWI was selected in March 2017. Construction started in November 2020. The new station is expected to begin serving passengers in the summer of 2027.

== Other facilities ==
In the Central station building on the first floor there is a Rimi hypermarket. Directly nearby is Stockmann supermarket and the largest cinema in the city — Forum cinemas. In the station there are a lot of popular restaurants such as "Čili pica", Hesburger etc. Opposite Marijas iela there is a McDonald's, Burger King restaurants and a few hotels.

About 50–100 metres walk west-southwest one can also access Riga Central Market and Riga International Coach Terminal nearby.

== Public transport ==
There are many stops at this location. The main stop is the railway station, Riga Central Station, which operates all passenger trains within Latvia. Most public transport stops are situated in the nearby streets — Marijas iela, Merķeļa iela, Satekles iela and 13. janvāra iela. Buses and trolleybuses stop here.

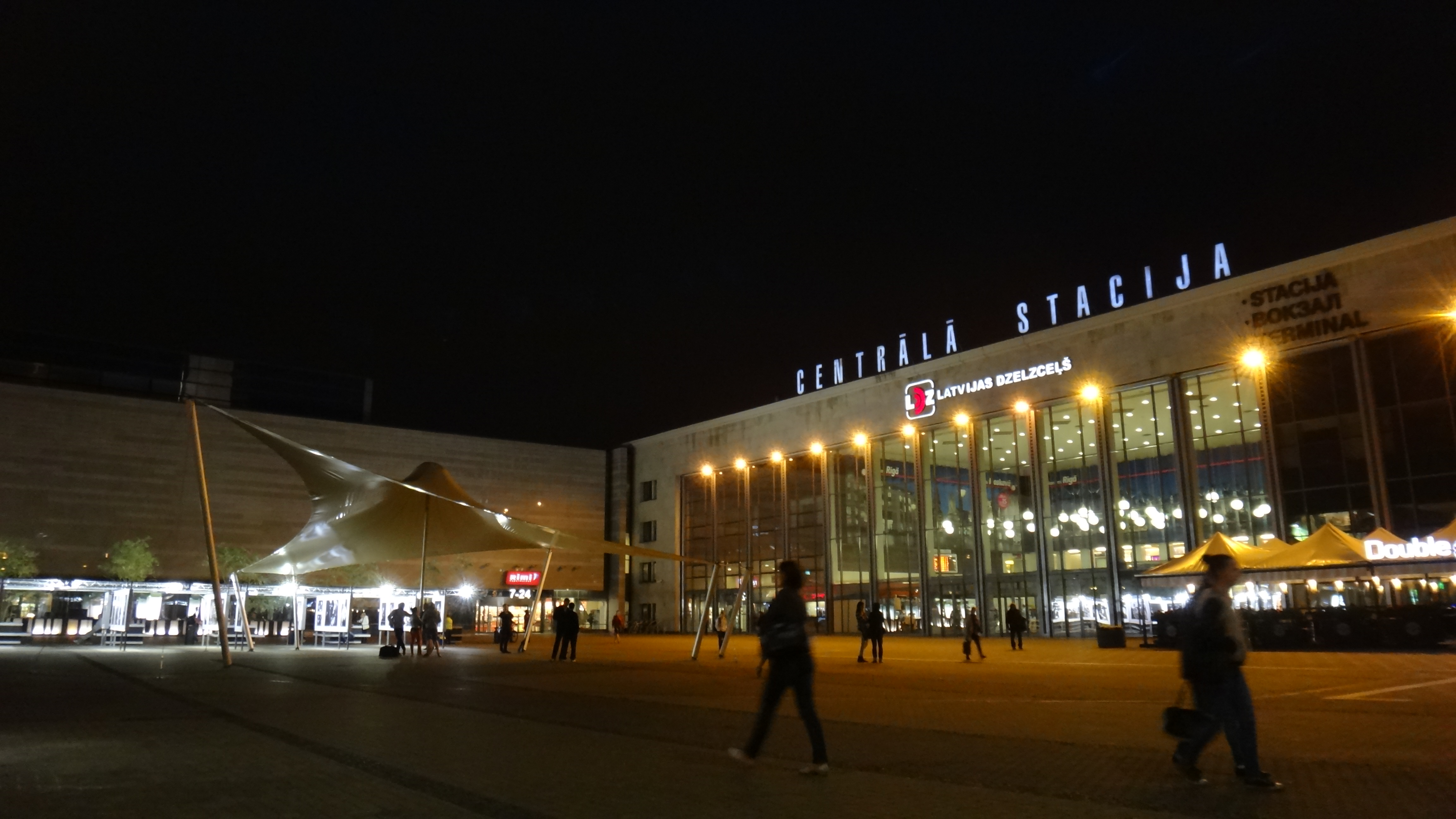
Riga Central in 2012

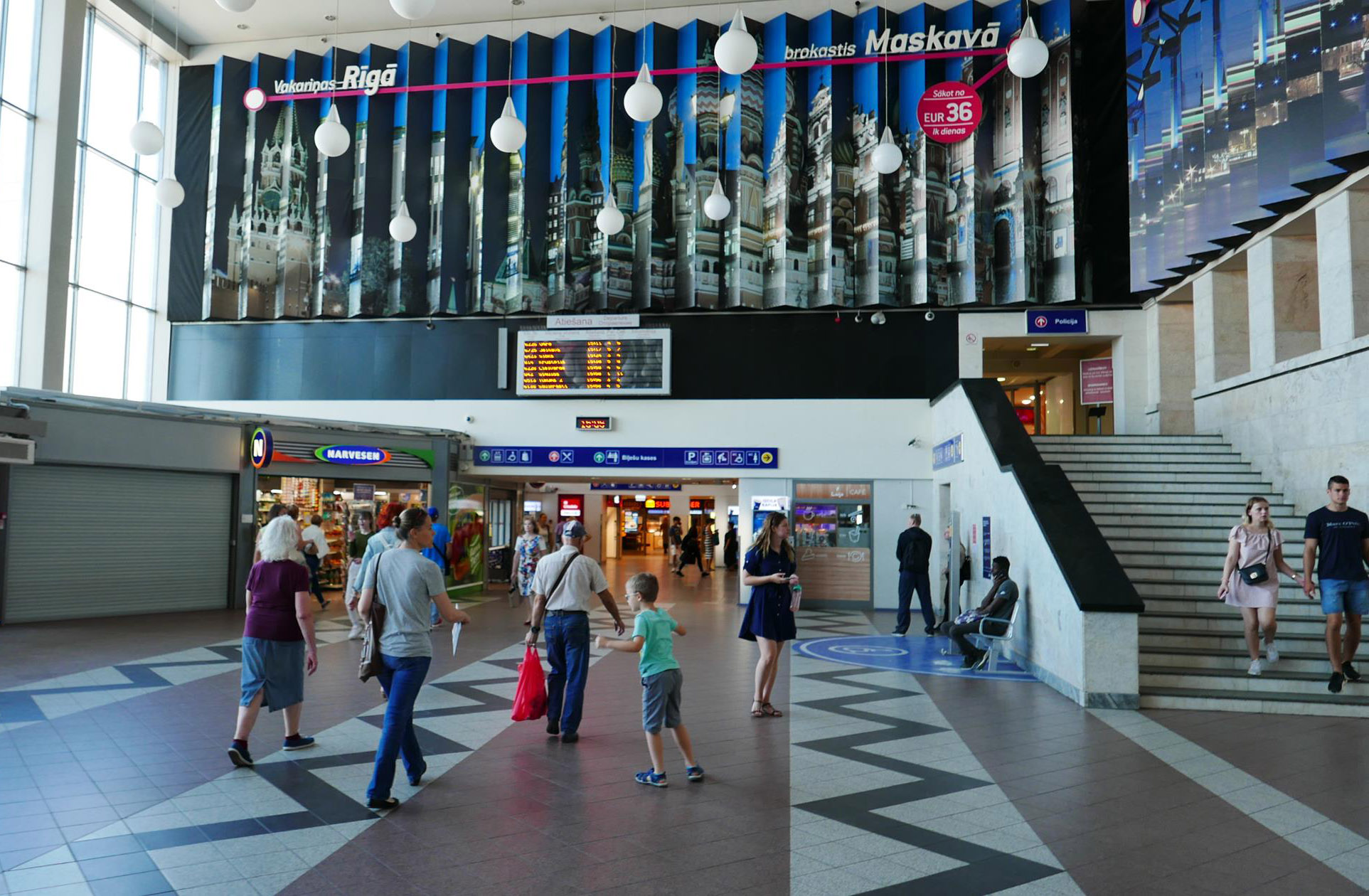
Interior in 2020

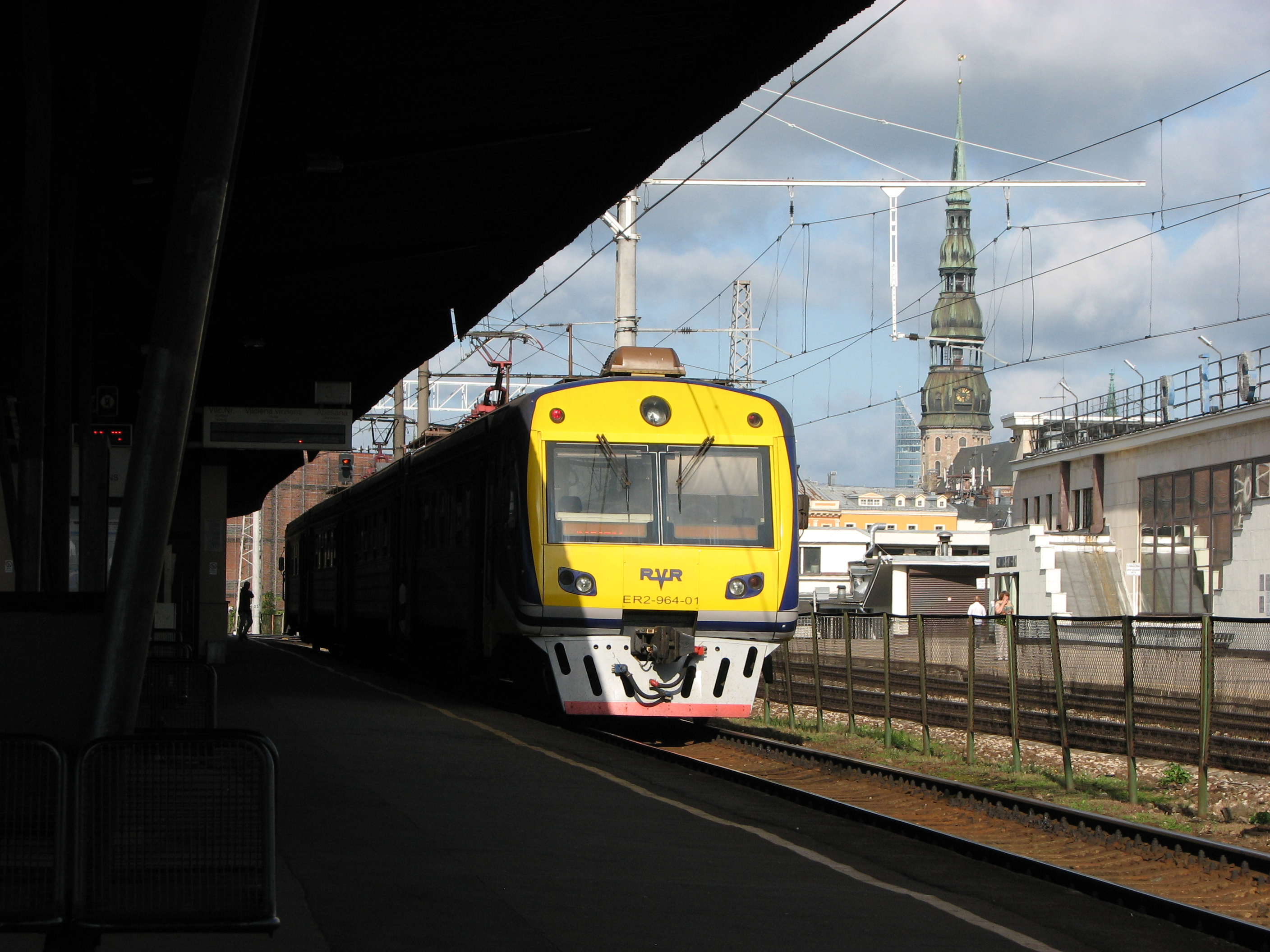
ER2-964 Riga train

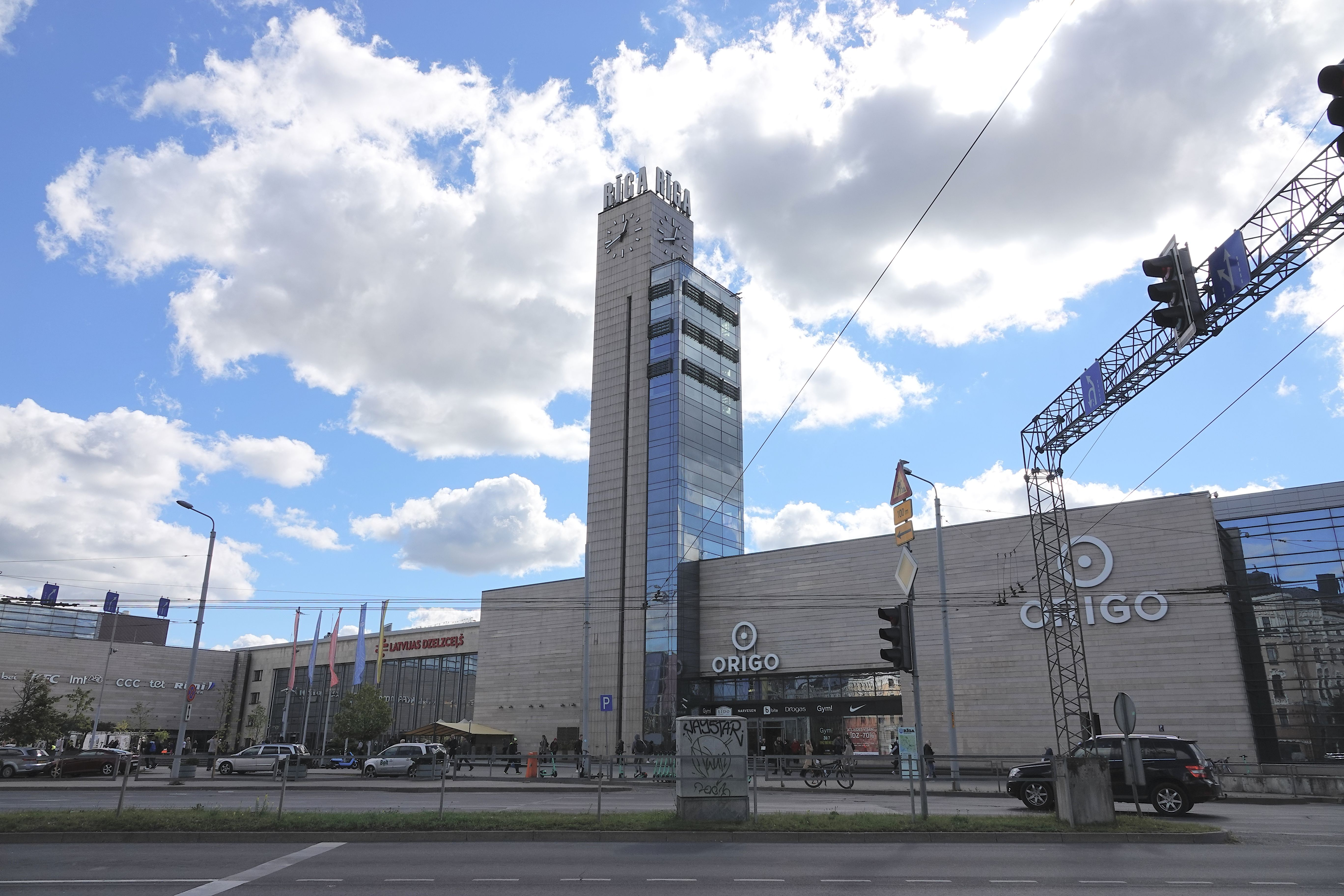
Clock Tower

== See also ==
- Rail transport in Latvia
- History of rail transport in Latvia
- Rail Baltica
- Transport in Latvia
