= Zemitāni–Skulte Railway =

Rail line in Latvia

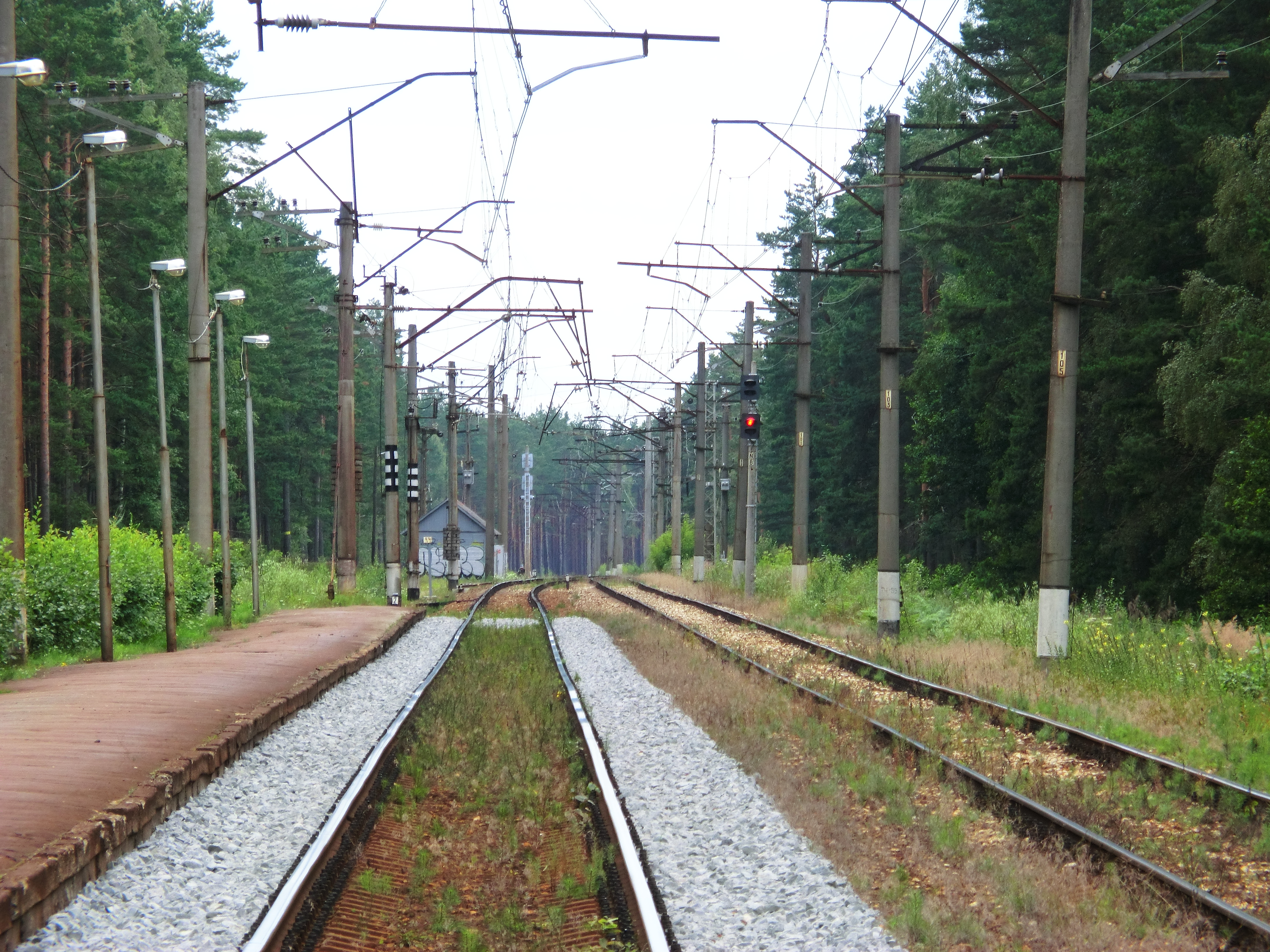
- Near the Inčupe Station

Overview
- Termini: Zemitāni Station; Skulte Station

Service
- Operator(s): Latvian Railways

History
- Opened: 1937

Technical
- Line length: 52 km (32.31 mi)
- Track gauge: 1,524 mm (5 ft)

The Zemitāni–Skulte Railway is a 52-kilometre (32 mi) long, 1,524 mm (5 ft) gauge railway in Latvia built in the 20th century to connect Riga and Rūjiena. The railway was originally part of the Mangaļi–Rūjiena Railway that opened 1937. In 1981 the line became part of the Riga–Tallinn Railway, with a travel time of five hours. In 1992, the Riga–Tallinn Railway was stopped at the border with Estonia. The Zemitāni–Skulte Railway got its present length in 1996 after the twice weekly service to Limbaži was discontinued due to the financial downturn following the collapse of the Soviet Union. The railway past Skulte was removed in 2004.

Railway lines in Latvia in 2016.

== See also ==
- Rail transport in Latvia
- History of rail transport in Latvia

== Bibliography ==
- Altbergs, T.; Augustāne, K.; Pētersone, I. (2009). Dzelzceļi Latvijā [Railways in Latvia] (in Latvian). Jumava. ISBN 978-9984-38-698-0.
