= Skulte Station =

Terminal railway station on the Zemitāni–Skulte Railway in Latvia

Skulte
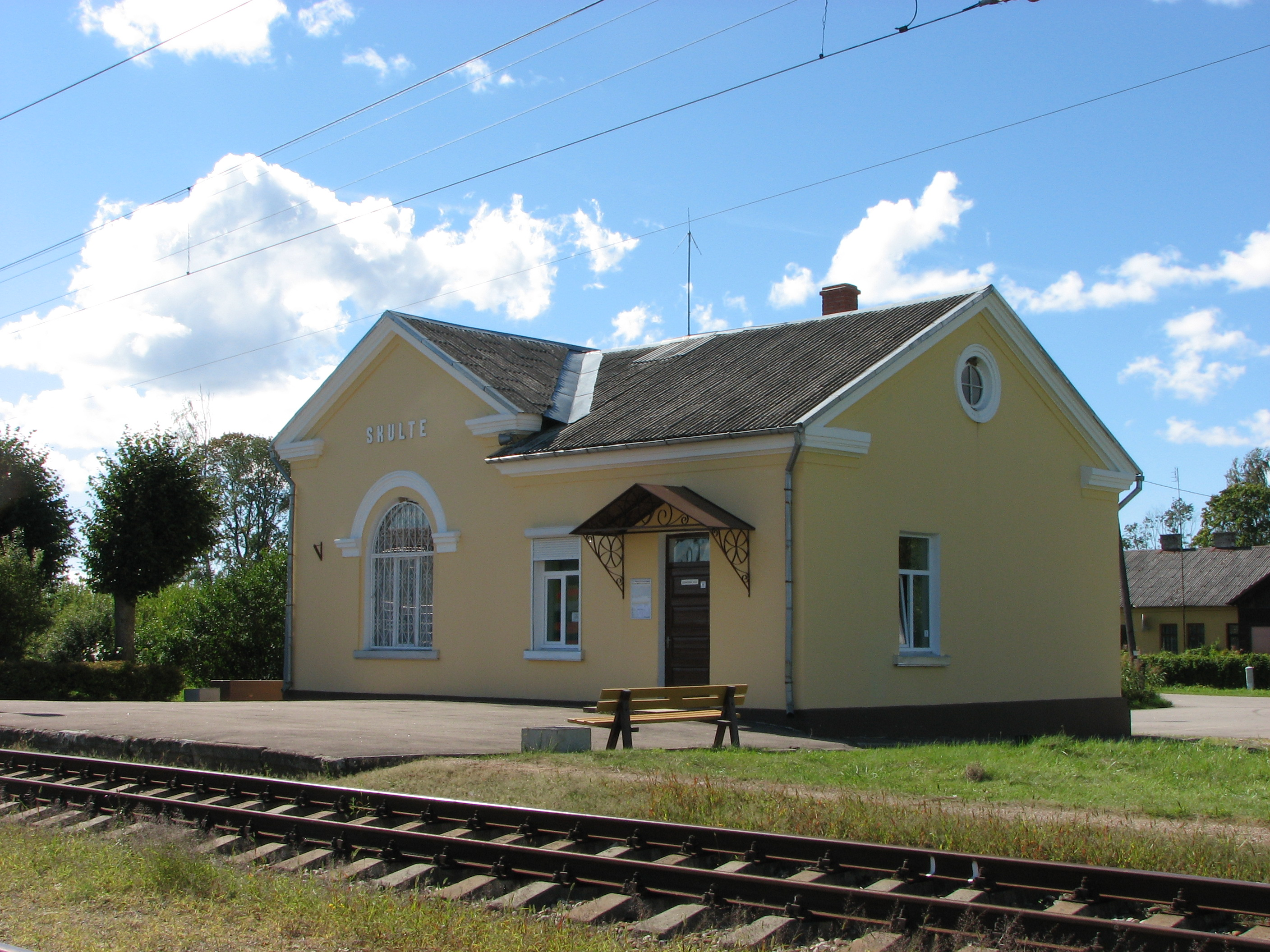
- Skulte Station in 2016

General information
- Location: Stacija Skulte, Skulte; Skulte parish, Limbaži Municipality; Latvia
- Coordinates: 57°20′0.2″N 24°27′46.8″E
- System: Terminal station
- Line: Zemitāni–Skulte Railway
- Platforms: 1
- Tracks: 2

History
- Opened: 1934

Services
Preceding station	LDz	Following station
Zvejniekciems towards Riga	Riga–Skulte Railway	Terminus
Location

Skulte Station is a railway station serving the village of Skulte in Skulte Parish, Latvia. The station is the northern terminus of the Zemitāni–Skulte Railway.

The Skulte platform was opened on 1 October 1934 on the Riga-Rujiena line. The passenger building was built in 1952.

In 1991, in connection with the opening of the Skulte port on the shore of the Gulf of Riga, the platform was rebuilt into a station, with a branch from the northern neck to a loading and unloading area, where the arriving cargo is reloaded onto road transport for subsequent delivery to the port.

In the same year, the Zvejniekciems - Skulte section was electrified, and the station, as the final point of the route, was equipped for the turnover of electric trains.
