= Lithuania–Russia border =

International border

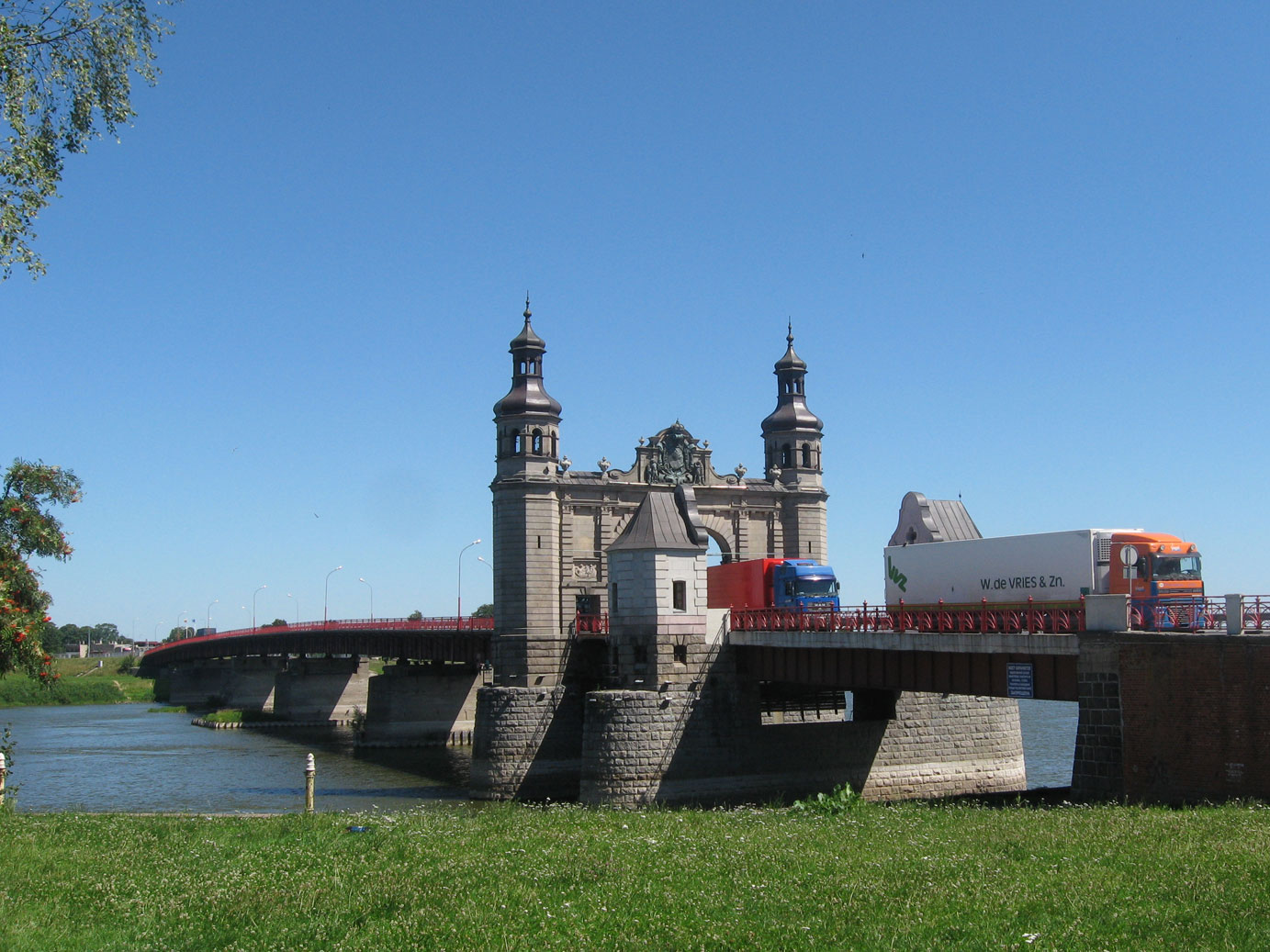
- Queen Louise Bridge over the border river Nemunas at Sovetsk

Characteristics
- Entities: Lithuania Russia
- Length: 297.1 km (184.6 mi), including the 22.2 km (13.8 mi) sea border

History
- Established: 1945
- Current shape: 24 October 1997
- Treaties: Treaty between the Republic of Lithuania and the Russian Federation concerning the State Border between Lithuania and Russia (1997)

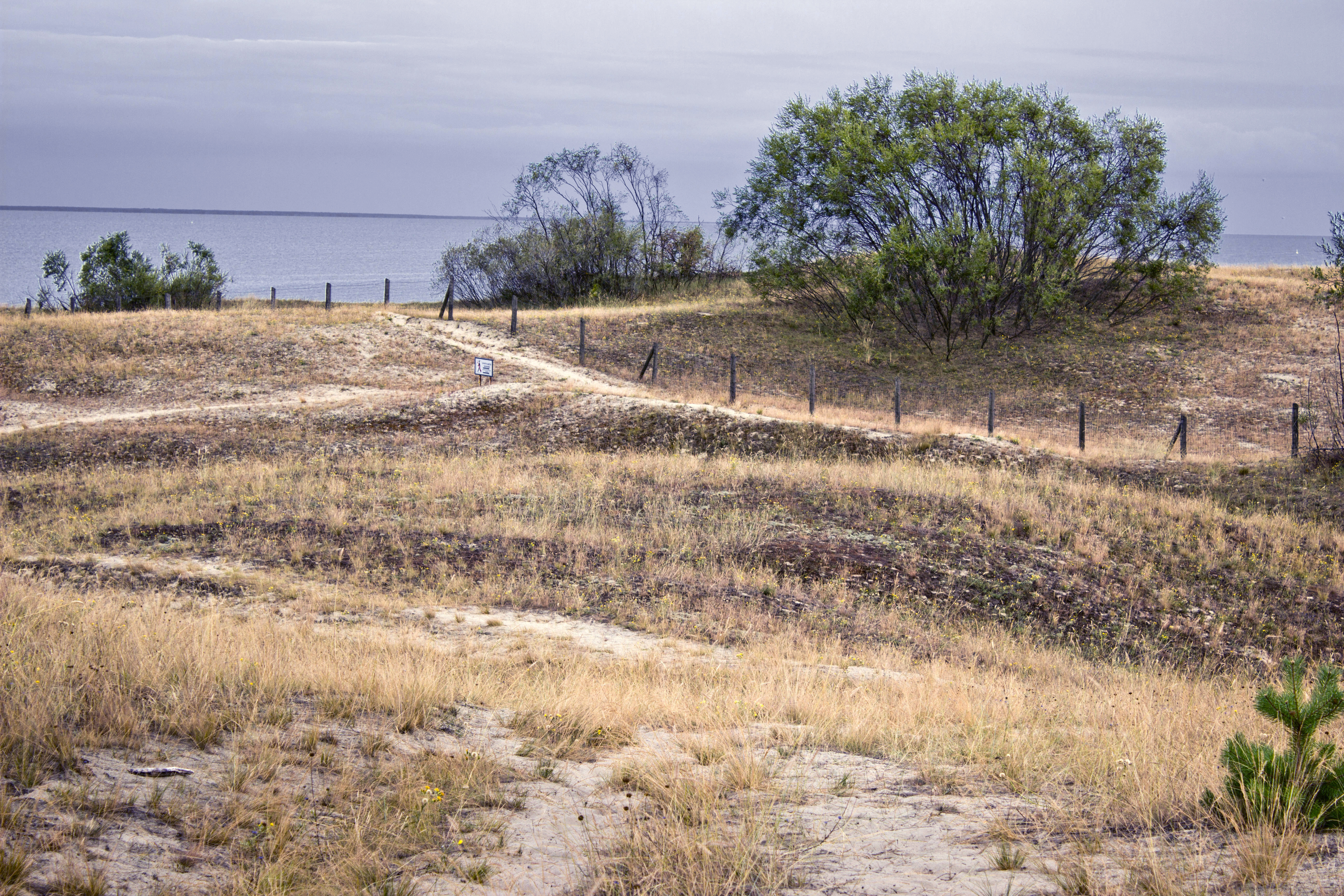
Lithuania-Russia border on the Curonian Spit.

Lithuanian and Russian boundary markers

The Lithuania–Russia border is an international border between the Republic of Lithuania (EU member) and Kaliningrad Oblast, an exclave of the Russian Federation (CIS member). It is an external border of the European Union. The 274.9 km (170.8 mi) long border passes (from west to south-east clockwise) through the Curonian Spit and Curonian Lagoon, and then follows along the Neman River, Šešupė, Širvinta, Liepona, and Lake Vištytis. The sea border is another 22.2 km (13.8 mi). There is a tripoint between Lithuania, Russia, and Poland with a stone monument at 54°21′48″N 22°47′31″E.

Most of the border follows rivers or lakes. On land, border stations are equipped with engineering and technical facilities (wired fences and the exclusion zone). Most other land areas have no fence, but some places near roads or villages have fences (e.g. at 54°27′11″N 22°42′08″E with Street View coverage). Russians need a Schengen visa to cross the border into Lithuania, and Lithuanians need a Russian visa to go to Russia.

== History ==
The historical borders between the Grand Duchy of Lithuania and Grand Duchy of Moscow varied significantly throughout the history and bore little resemblance to the modern borders. The first treaty between these states was signed on 31 August 1449. It was a medieval agreement between the monarchs which listed the territorial possessions, rights to particular towns and similar aspects, but did not define the border. The next peace treaty during the Muscovite–Lithuanian Wars was signed in 1494 and it contained more detailed description of the border, with even more detailed definition in the truce agreement of 1503. Therefore, the well defined state border between Lithuania and Muscovy emerged in the early 16th century. These medieval borders did not reflect the ethnic or religious differences between the local populations, but they were a part of the political process of state-building and, later in the 16th century, began to mark the difference between political cultures of the two neighbouring states.

The modern border between the countries runs along the line of the former Lithuanian–German border established in 1918. It bordered Lithuania and East Prussia. In 1923, the Klaipėda Region (Memelland) was transferred to Lithuania, but in 1939 Lithuania was forced to return it to Germany. The current Lithuanian–Russian border was established after World War II, when Königsberg and the territory around it was annexed by the Soviet Union. In 1945, following the Soviet occupation of the Baltic states, the boundary was an internal border of the Soviet Union between the Kaliningrad Oblast of RSFSR and the Lithuanian SSR.

In 1990, Lithuania restored its independence and the boundary became an international border again, making Kaliningrad Oblast an exclave. In 1997, the Russian Federation and the Republic of Lithuania signed a border agreement, intended to complete border demarcation and to reduce inconveniences of the border. For example, at Lake Vištytis the border ran along the waterline of the beaches on the Lithuanian side, so anyone paddling in the water was technically crossing into Russia. In return, Russia received the appropriate territorial compensation in other areas. The treaty entered into force in 2003.

=== 2010s and 2020s ===
In early 2017, with increasing military activity and political tensions in the region, the Lithuanian government announced plans to reinforce the Kaliningrad/Ramoniškiai area border crossing with a fence 2 m (6 ft 7 in) in height, funded by NATO.

On 13 September 2023, Lithuania banned vehicles with Russian license plates from entering its territory, in accordance with a decision by the European Union.

Russia introduced a bill on 21 May 2024, aiming to redefine its maritime boundaries in the Baltic Sea. The proposed changes would expand its territorial waters by altering the maritime borders it shares with Finland and Lithuania, effective from January 2025. Initially published on the official website of the Registry of Laws, the text of the bill was later taken down.

== Border crossings ==
Image	Lithuanian name/road	Russian name/road	Type	Status	Coordinates
	Route 167 – Nida	27A-015 – Morskoe	Road	Closed	55.279788°N 20.963893°E
	Pagėgiai	Sovetsk	Railway	Active	55.090763°N 21.886789°E
	A 12 / E77 – Panemunė	A 216 / E77 – Sovetsk	Road	Active	55.083649°N 21.905818°E
	Route 184 – Ramoniškiai	27K-105 – Pogranichnyy	Road	Temporarily closed	55.059609°N 22.591793°E
	A 7 / E28 – Kybartai	A 229 / E28 – Chernyshevskoye	Road and railway	Active	54.641721°N 22.743941°E
	Vytauto g. – Kudirkos Naumiestis	R509 – Kutuzovo	Road	Closed	54.775988°N 22.855040°E
	Route 200 (Dariaus ir Girėno g.) – Vištytis	27K-210 – Malaya Belozernoye	Road	Closed	54.453573°N 22.703110°E

== See also ==
- Baltic Defence Line
