= Misa =

Misa or MISA may refer to:

== Characters ==
- Pixy Misa (ピクシィミサ), a character in the anime Magical Girl Pretty Sammy
- Misa Amane (弥 海砂), a character in the manga, anime and film Death Note
- Misa Arashiyama (嵐山 美佐), a character in the toksatsu series Taiyou Sentai Sun Vulcan
- Misa Hayase (早瀬 未沙), one of the central characters of the Macross series
- Misa Kakizaki (柿崎 美砂), a character in the Negima! anime and manga series
- Misa Kurobane (くろばね みさ), a character in the anime television series Charlotte
- Misa (ミサ), a character in the video game Gundam Breaker 3

== People ==
- G3 Misa, a Filipino dancer/Latino
- Misa Amano (天野 美沙), Japanese swimmer
- Misa Bharti, Indian politician
- Misa Eguchi (江口実沙), Japanese tennis player
- Misa Etō (衛藤 美彩), Japanese gravure idol
- Misa Kuranaga (倉永美沙), Japanese ballerina
- Misa Matsushima (松島美紗), Japanese fighter pilot
- Misa Nishiyama (西山 実沙; born 2010), Japanese artistic gymnast
- Misa Shimizu (清水美沙), a Japanese actress who appears regularly in Masayuki Suo's films
- Misa Tamagawa (玉川 美沙), Japanese radio show host
- Misa Yamamura (山村 美紗), Japanese novelist
- Misa Uehara (actress, born 1937) (上原美佐), a Japanese actress most notable for her roles in The Hidden Fortress and Storm Over the Pacific
- Misa Watanabe (渡辺 美佐; born 1964), a Japanese voice actress
- Misa, bass player for the Japanese rock band Band-Maid

== Places ==
- Misa (Etruscan village), an Etruscan village in Emilia-Romagna, Italy
- Misa River, in Semigallia, Latvia
- Misa (river in Italy), a river in the Marche region
- Mişä, Tatar name for the Myosha River
- Misa, Lucknow, a village in Uttar Pradesh, India

== Rivers ==
- Misa (river in Italy)
- Misa (river in Latvia)
- Misa River, A small river in Assam, India

== Other uses ==
- 569 Misa, an asteroid
- Maintenance of Internal Security Act, a 1971 Indian law
- Media Institute of Southern Africa
  - Media Institute of Southern Africa (MISA) Malawi
- Miahnhada, Saranghanda (미안하다 사랑한다, shortened to "Misa": I'm Sorry, I Love You), a Korean TV drama
- Misa (moth), a genus of moths in the family Noctuidae
- Míša, a frozen Czech treat

== See also ==
- MISA (disambiguation)
