= Queen Louise Bridge =

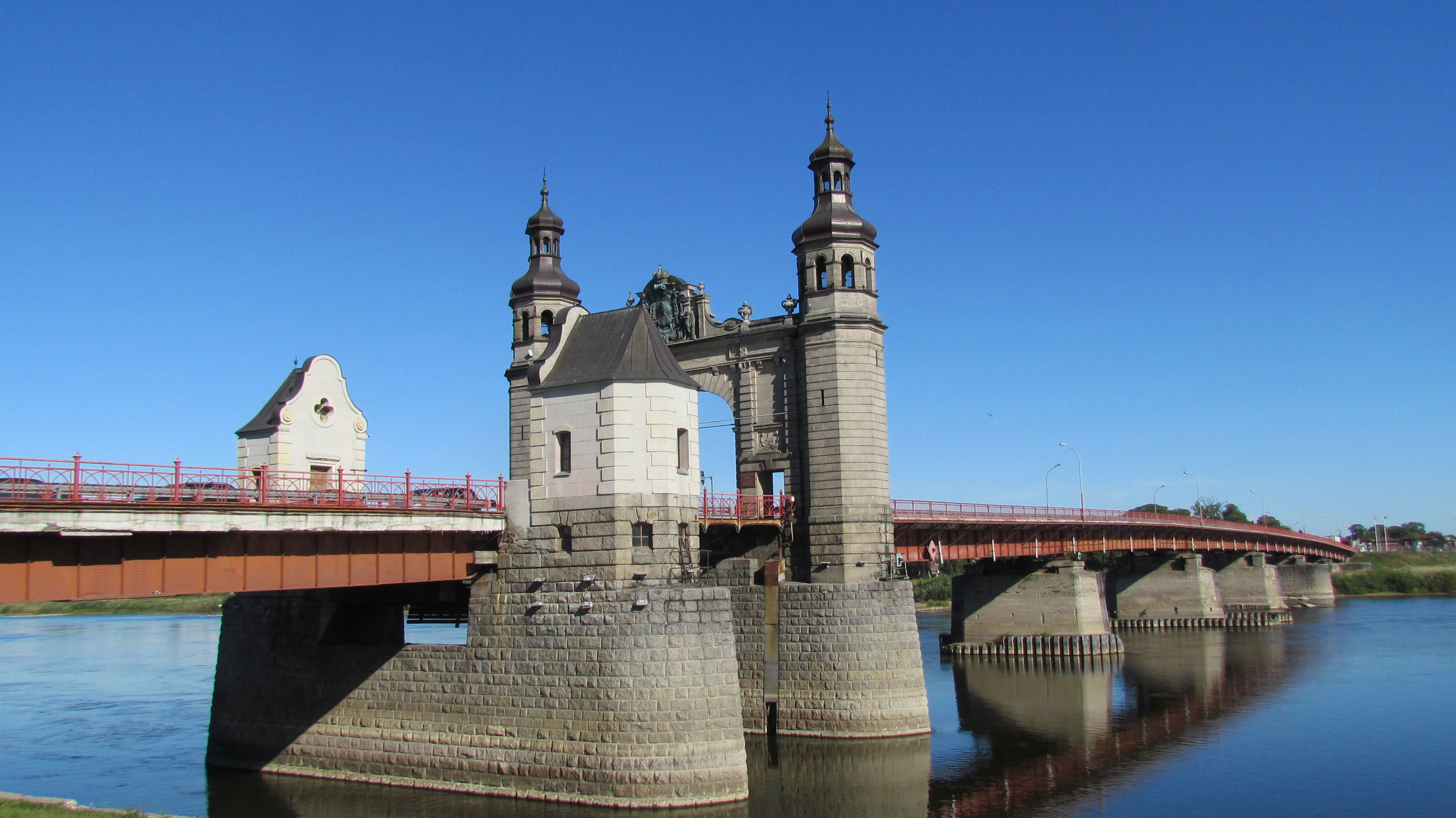
- Coordinates: 55°05′01″N 21°54′20″E
- Carries: E77, A12
- Crosses: Neman River
- Locale: Lithuania–Russia border

Characteristics
- Total length: 416.3 metres (1,366 ft)
- Height: 11.4 metres (37 ft)

History
- Construction end: 1907

Location
- Interactive map of Queen Louise Bridge

The Queen Louise Bridge (German: Königin-Luise-Brücke; Russian: Мост королевы Луизы; Lithuanian: Karalienės Luizos tiltas) is a bridge over the Neman River on the Lithuania–Russia border, that connects the Lithuanian town of Panemunė and the Russian city of Sovetsk, historically Tilsit. It is named after Queen Louise of Mecklenburg-Strelitz.

== Gallery ==
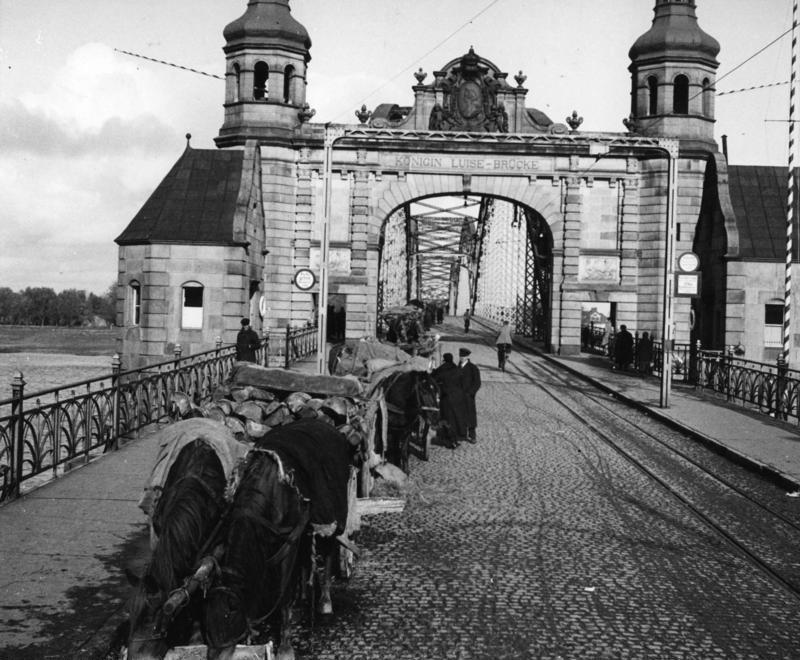
Bridge in 1930

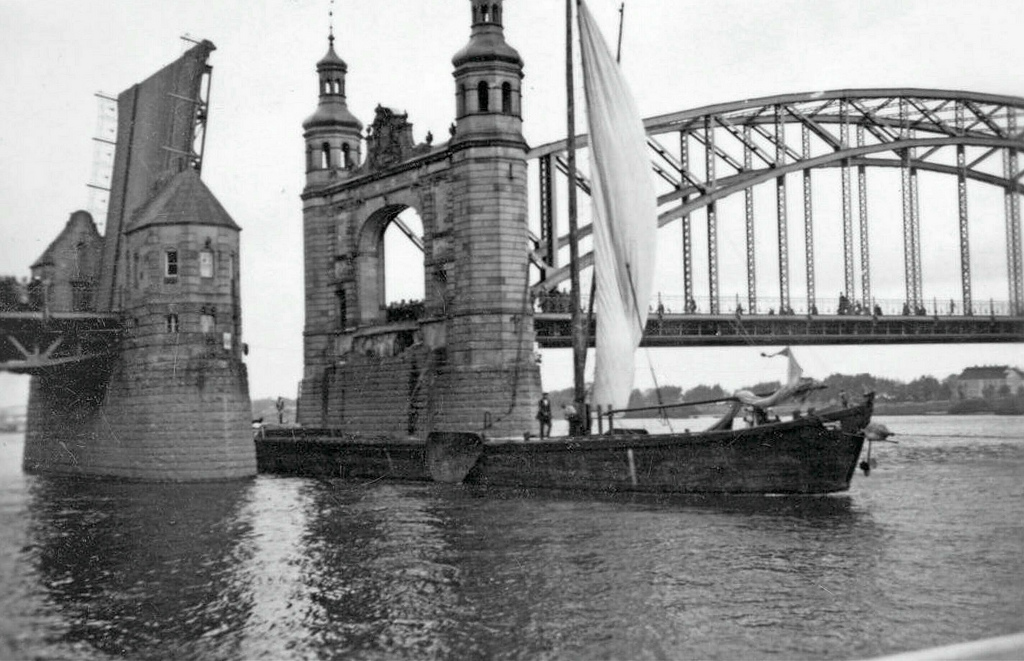
Part of the bridge raised in 1911

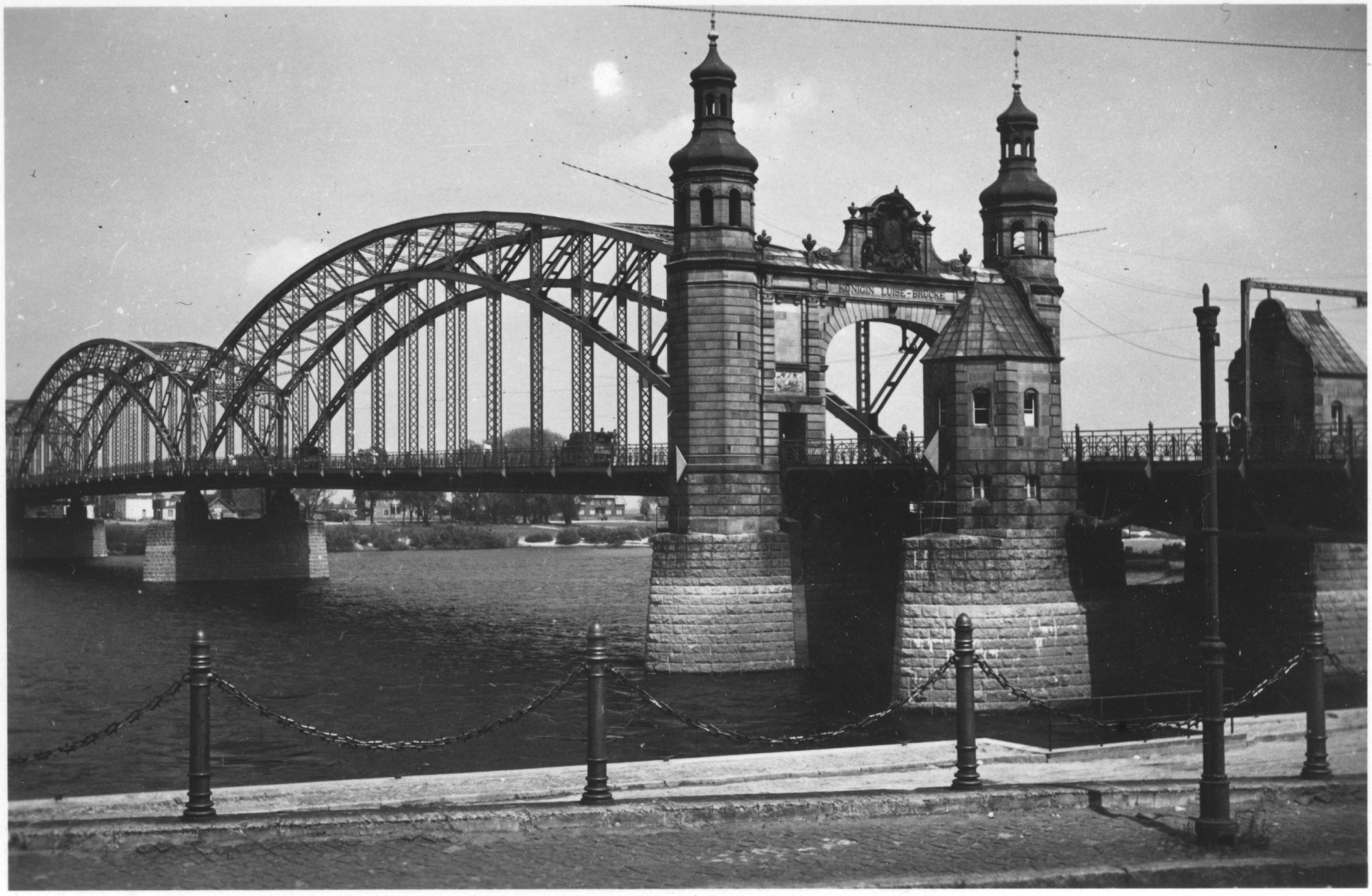
Bridge in 1941

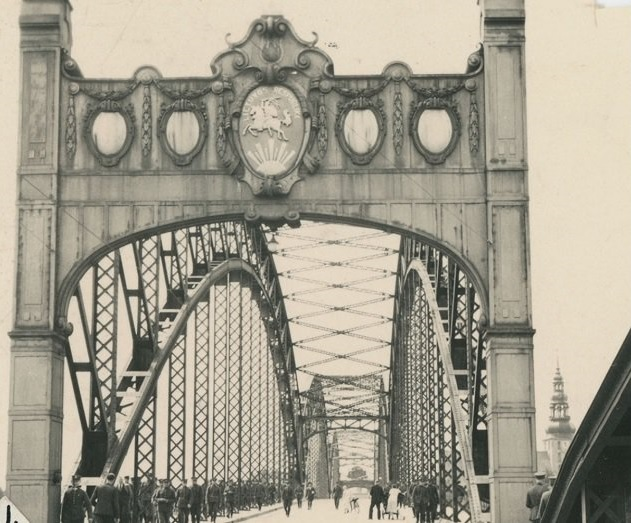
Lithuanian-side of the bridge in Panemunė with the coat of arms of Lithuania in 1937

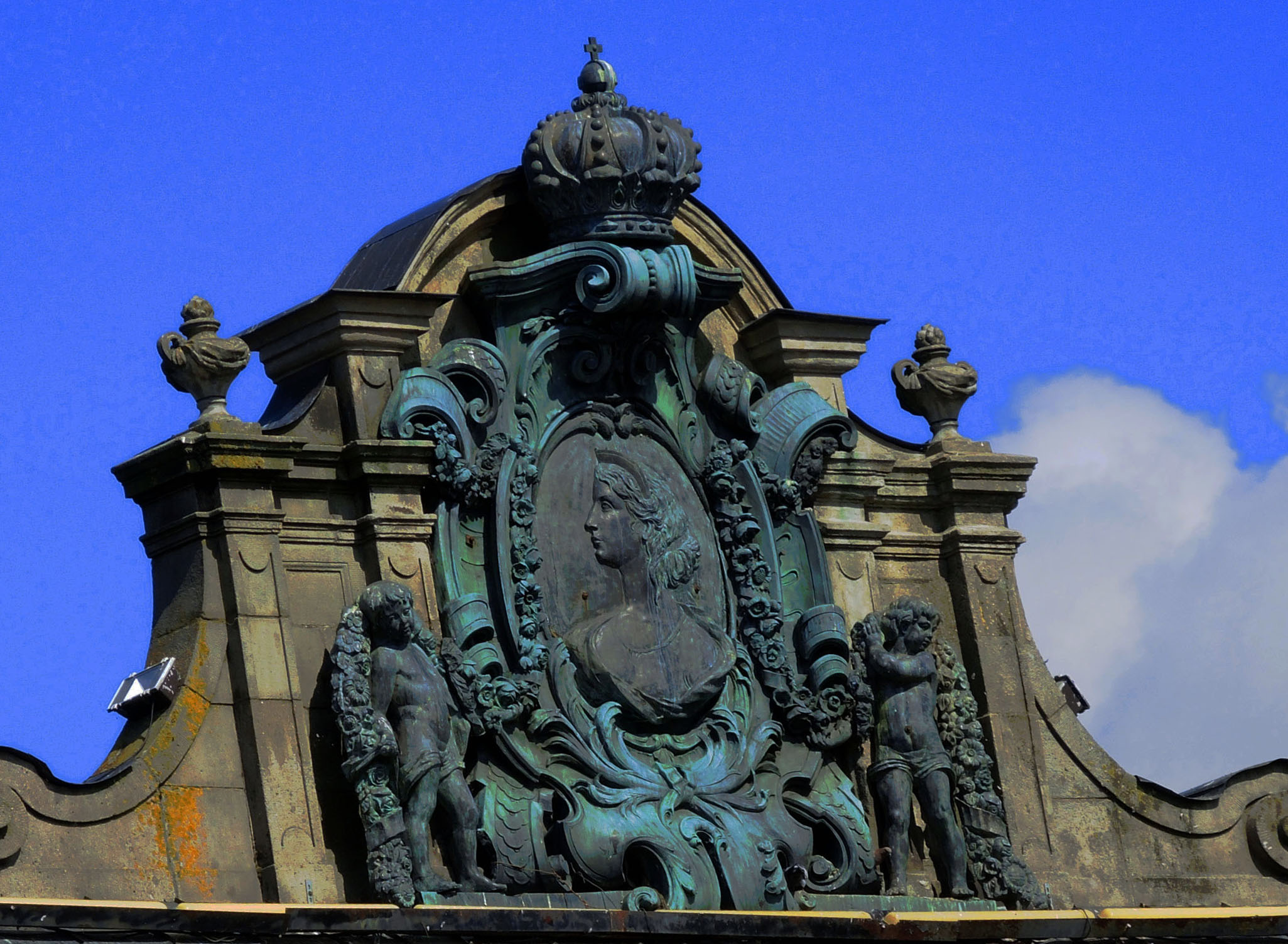
Portrait of Queen Louise of Mecklenburg-Strelitz in the Russian side of the bridge

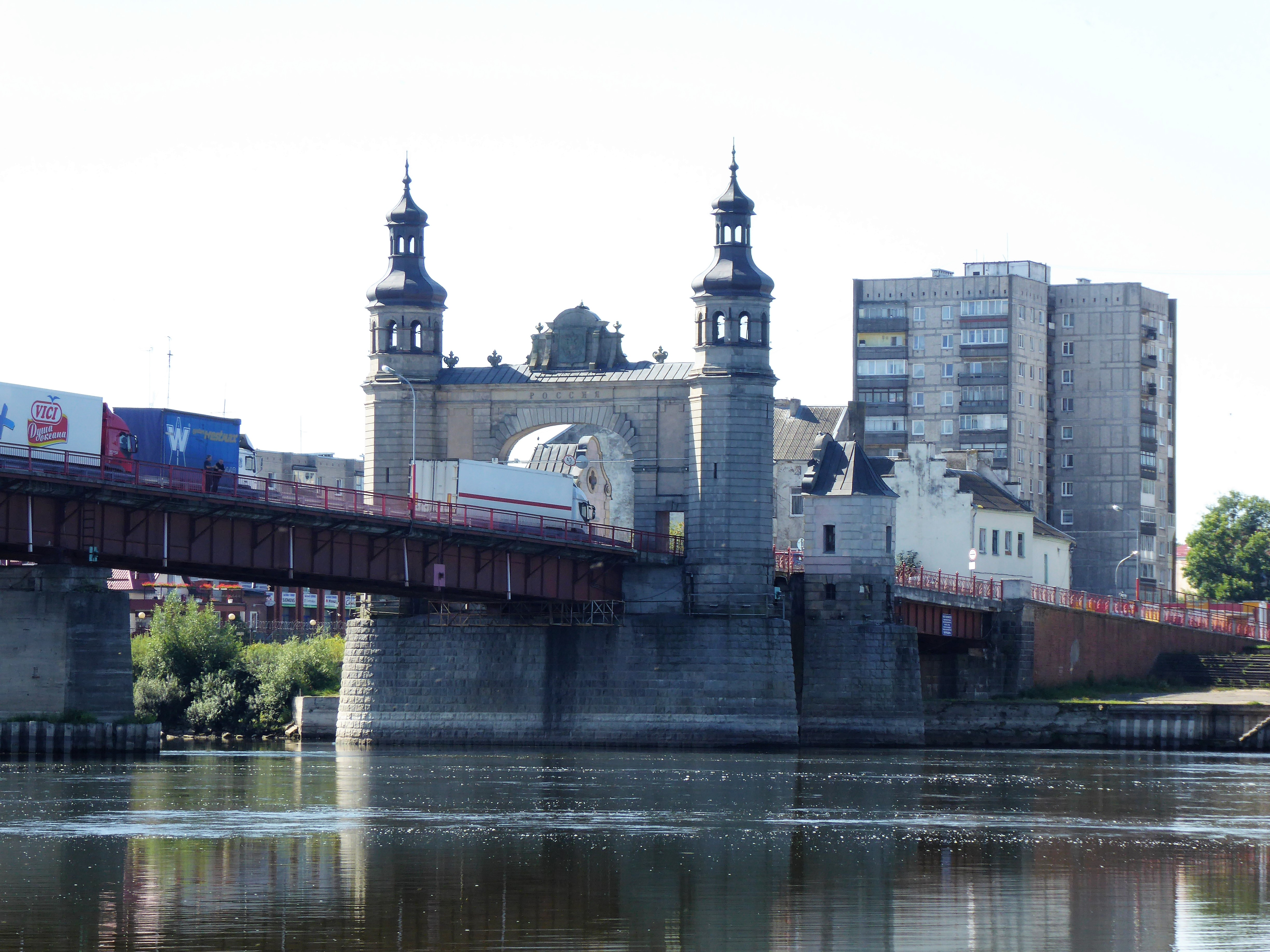
View from the Lithuanian side towards the Russian side of the bridge

== See also ==
- List of international bridges
