= Maszków =

Maszków may refer to the following places in Poland:

- Maszków, Lower Silesian Voivodeship (south-west Poland)
- Maszków, Lesser Poland Voivodeship (south Poland)
- Maszków, Lubusz Voivodeship (west Poland)
