= A8 road (Latvia) =

Road in Latvia

Coordinates: 56.666074°N 23.82117°E

A8
- Jelgavas šoseja

Route information
- Part of E77
- Length: 76.1 km (47.3 mi)

Major junctions
- North end: Riga
- A 5 near Olaine P 100 near Jelgava; P 93 near Jelgava; P 94 near Jelgava P 103 near Eleja
- South end: Lithuania border near Meitene; E77 A 12 A12

Location
- Country: Latvia
- Major cities: Riga, Olaine, Jelgava, Eleja

Highway system
- National Roads in Latvia
← A 7	→ A 9

The A8 is a main national road in Latvia. It is officially named Rīga–Jelgava–Lietuvas robeža (Meitene) and connects Riga with Jelgava and the Lithuanian border near Meitene. The road is commonly known as the Jelgava Highway (Jelgavas šoseja). Its total length is 76.1 km (47.3 mi).

The A8 forms part of European route E77 and is included in Latvia's TEN-T road network. At the Lithuanian border, the road continues as the Lithuanian A12 toward Šiauliai.

== Route description ==
The A8 starts in Riga. According to the official route list, the Riga section follows a route that overlaps with parts of the A6 and A7 and includes Kārļa Ulmaņa gatve and Vienības gatve. South-west of Riga, the road passes near Olaine and Jaunolaine before continuing toward Jelgava.

The A8 crosses the Misa and Iecava rivers north of Jelgava and reaches Jelgava from the north. In Jelgava, the official municipal section follows Aizsargu iela, Miera iela and Lietuvas šoseja. South of Jelgava, the road continues through Eleja toward the Lithuanian border at Meitene.

The road has a dual-carriageway layout with two lanes in each direction from Riga toward the Jelgava bypass area. Other parts of the route have one lane in each direction, with some short sections of wider or 2+1-type layout and additional lanes near junctions. The route is paved with asphalt concrete along its full length.

Outside built-up areas, the ordinary maximum speed limit is generally 90 km/h (56 mph), unless otherwise signed. In 2026, a seasonal maximum speed limit of 100 km/h (62 mph) was introduced on the A8 from Riga to Jaunolaine, km 9.98–18.96.

== Lane configuration ==
Approximate lane configuration by length:

10 km	20 km	1.5 km	11.5 km	6.5 km	27 km
Urban	2+2 road	2+1 road	1+1 road	Urban	1+1 road

== Motorway and expressway plans ==
Plans to reconstruct the Riga–Jelgava corridor to a higher standard date back to at least the 2000s. In 2006, an environmental impact assessment procedure was started for the reconstruction of the A8 from the Riga boundary to km 48.5, near Jelgava. The project was intended to respond to rising traffic intensity and envisaged reconstruction of about 31 km (19 mi) of the road as a motorway-standard route, about 4 km (2.5 mi) as an expressway-standard route, and construction of about 3.6 km (2.2 mi) of new expressway-standard road.

The planned project would have separated through traffic from local traffic by creating a parallel-road network and building seven multilevel junctions. The parallel roads were planned on one or both sides of the motorway section. The environmental impact assessment opinion was issued on 19 August 2008. The full motorway-standard reconstruction was not implemented; later works on the corridor instead focused mainly on pavement strengthening, resurfacing, bridge works and traffic-safety improvements.

== Reconstruction and improvements ==
In 2014, Latvijas Valsts ceļi reported that pavement strengthening had been completed on the A8 section from Jelgava to the Lielvircava turn-off, km 49–60. The works included recycling the old asphalt pavement, laying three new asphalt layers, renewing the bridge over the Platone, widening the carriageway and building sidewalks, repairing and cleaning culverts, and rebuilding bus stops. The works were carried out by SIA Strabag, with total investment of €6.46 million excluding VAT, of which 85% was financed by the European Union Cohesion Fund.

The next section from the Lielvircava turn-off through Eleja to the Lithuanian border, km 60–76, was also planned for pavement strengthening at that time. The project included lighting, a regulated and illuminated pedestrian crossing in Eleja and reconstruction of bus stops. Its contract value was €5.63 million excluding VAT, also with 85% Cohesion Fund co-financing.

In 2016, pavement renewal was planned on the A8 section from the bridge over the Misa to the turn-off to Ozolnieki, km 29.95–31.80. The contract was awarded to SIA Lemminkainen Latvija.

In 2020, reconstruction was completed on the left carriageway of the A8 between Jaunolaine and the bridge over the Misa, km 19.20–29.95. The works included recycling the pavement, strengthening the pavement structure, laying three asphalt layers, rebuilding the bridge over the Misa and renewing bus stops. The works were carried out by AS A.C.B. for €10.16 million, including VAT, financed from the Latvian state budget.

In 2022, reconstruction works were carried out on the right carriageway of the A8 from the Riga boundary to Jaunolaine, km 9.93–18.93. The works included pavement strengthening, recycling the old asphalt pavement, adding new mineral materials, laying three asphalt layers, improving drainage, renewing bus stops and rebuilding the pedestrian tunnel near Medemciems. The contract value was €6.77 million, including VAT, of which €5.76 million was Cohesion Fund financing.

In 2024, further works were planned and carried out on the A8 from Riga to Jaunolaine and on the Dalbe–Bajāri section, km 29.1–43.14. LVC described the Dalbe–Bajāri works as asphalt-concrete pavement renewal over more than 14 km (8.7 mi), noting cracks, rutting and drainage problems along the road shoulders. The Riga-region works included renewal of the left carriageway from the Riga boundary to Jaunolaine over almost 10 km (6.2 mi), including binder and wearing courses.

== Traffic and enforcement ==
Latvijas Valsts ceļi publishes traffic-intensity statistics for state roads as the average number of vehicles per day. In the 2025 dataset, the unweighted average of the listed A8 section values was 15,015 vehicles per day.

Average-speed enforcement has been introduced on the A8. On 3 October 2023, an average-speed-control section began operating on the Jelgava Highway from Spodras to the junction with Parka aleja in Eleja, km 50.0–69.2. The system also checks compulsory vehicle insurance, technical inspection status and road-user-charge compliance.

In 2023, the maximum permitted speed at the A8 junction with the local road Ozolnieki–Brankas–Brankstūri (V1068) was reduced from 70 km/h (43 mph) to 50 km/h (31 mph). LVC stated that the change was made because the junction had been included in the black-spot map and had a history of crashes with casualties.

== Major intersections ==
Road	Location or connection
A 5	near Olaine; connection with the Riga bypass
P 100	near Jelgava; connection toward Dalbe and Jelgava
P 93	near Jelgava
P 94	near Jelgava
P 103	near Eleja
E77 A 12	Lithuanian border near Meitene; continuation toward Šiauliai

== Settlements on or near the route ==
- Riga
- Olaine
- Jaunolaine
- Dalbe
- Jelgava
- Eleja
- Meitene

== See also ==
- Transport in Latvia
- List of National Roads in Latvia
- European route E77
- A12 highway (Lithuania)
