= Sieciechowice =

Sieciechowice may refer to:

- Sieciechowice, Kraków County, a Polish village
- Sieciechowice, Tarnów County, a Polish village
