= Żerkowice =

Żerkowice may refer to the following places in Poland:

- Żerkowice, Lower Silesian Voivodeship (south-west Poland)
- Żerkowice, Lesser Poland Voivodeship (south Poland)
- Żerkowice, Opole Voivodeship (south-west Poland)
