= Celiny, Lesser Poland Voivodeship =

Celiny
- Village
- Location within Poland
- Coordinates: 50°15′33″N 19°59′25″E
- Country: Poland
- Voivodeship: Lesser Poland
- County: Kraków
- Gmina: Iwanowice

Celiny [t͡sɛˈlinɨ] is a village in the administrative district of Gmina Iwanowice, within Kraków County, Lesser Poland Voivodeship, in southern Poland.
