= Grzegorzowice Małe =

Village in Poland

- Village
- Location within Poland
- Coordinates: 50°15′38″N 19°56′55″E
- Country: Poland
- Voivodeship: Lesser Poland
- County: Kraków
- Gmina: Iwanowice

Grzegorzowice Małe [ɡʐɛɡɔʐɔˈvit͡sɛ ˈmawɛ] is a village in the administrative district of Gmina Iwanowice, within Kraków County, Lesser Poland Voivodeship, in southern Poland.
