= Zalesie, Gmina Iwanowice =

Zalesie
- Village
- Location within Poland
- Coordinates: 50°11′58″N 20°1′34″E
- Country: Poland
- Voivodeship: Lesser Poland
- County: Kraków
- Gmina: Iwanowice

Zalesie [zaˈlɛɕɛ] is a village in the administrative district of Gmina Iwanowice, within Kraków County, Lesser Poland Voivodeship, in southern Poland.
