= Iwanowice, Kraków County =

Iwanowice
- Village
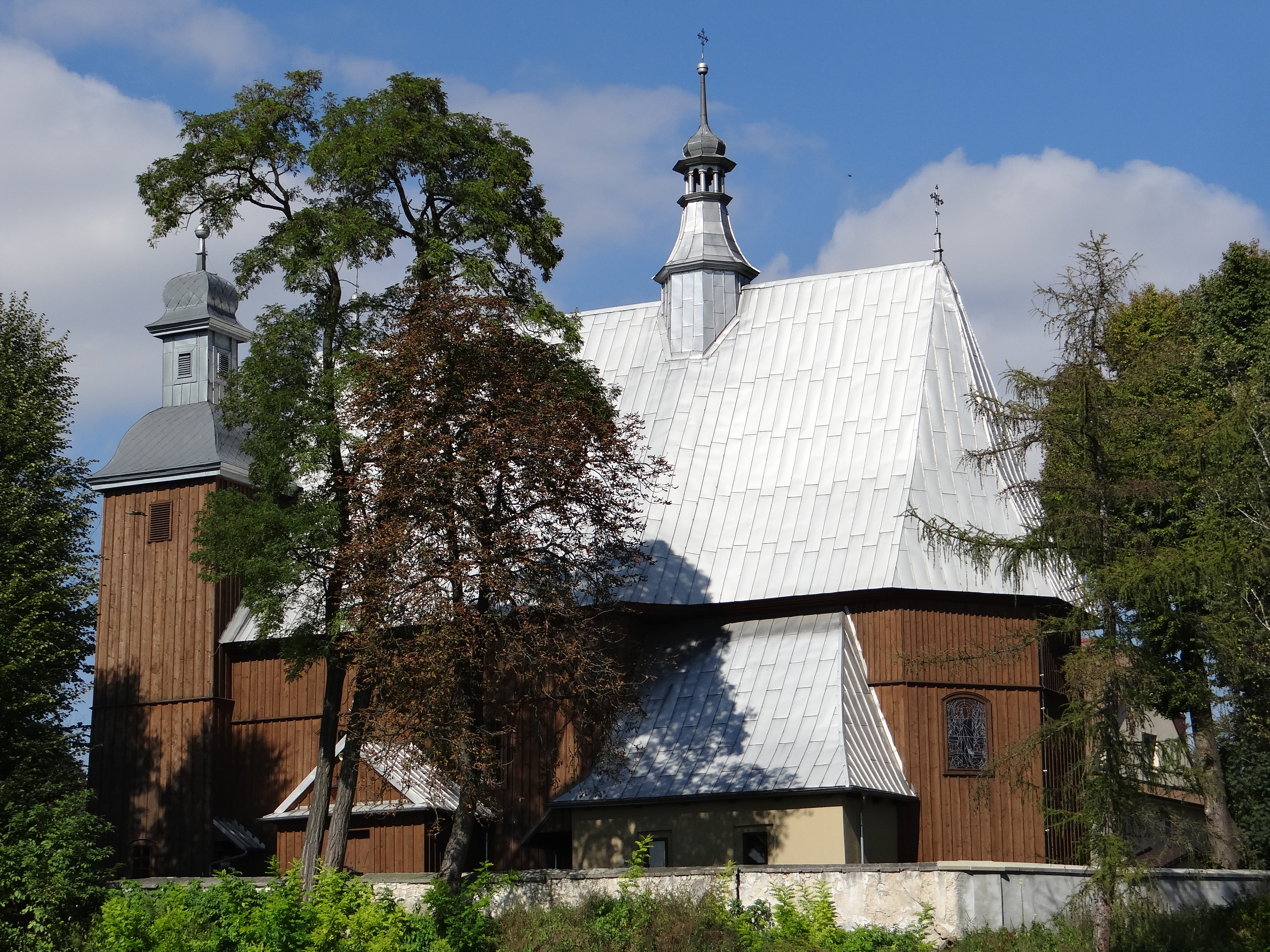
- Holy Trinity church

- Location within Poland
- Coordinates: 50°13′38″N 19°57′25″E
- Country: Poland
- Voivodeship: Lesser Poland
- County: Kraków
- Gmina: Iwanowice
- Population: 540

Iwanowice [ivanɔˈvit͡sɛ] is a village in Kraków County, Lesser Poland Voivodeship, in southern Poland. It is the seat of the gmina (administrative district) called Gmina Iwanowice.
