= Krasieniec Zakupny =

- Village
- Location within Poland
- Coordinates: 50°12′41″N 19°56′53″E
- Country: Poland
- Voivodeship: Lesser Poland
- County: Kraków
- Gmina: Iwanowice

Krasieniec Zakupny [kraˈɕɛɲɛt͡s zaˈkupnɨ] is a village in the administrative district of Gmina Iwanowice, within Kraków County, Lesser Poland Voivodeship, in southern Poland.
