= Grzegorzowice Wielkie =

- Village
- Location within Poland
- Coordinates: 50°15′17″N 19°57′27″E
- Country: Poland
- Voivodeship: Lesser Poland
- County: Kraków
- Gmina: Iwanowice

Grzegorzowice Wielkie [ɡʐɛɡɔʐɔˈvit͡sɛ ˈvjɛlkʲɛ] is a village in the administrative district of Gmina Iwanowice, within Kraków County, Lesser Poland Voivodeship, in southern Poland.
