= Talpaki =

Settlement in Kaliningrad Oblast

Talpaki Талпáки
- Rural locality
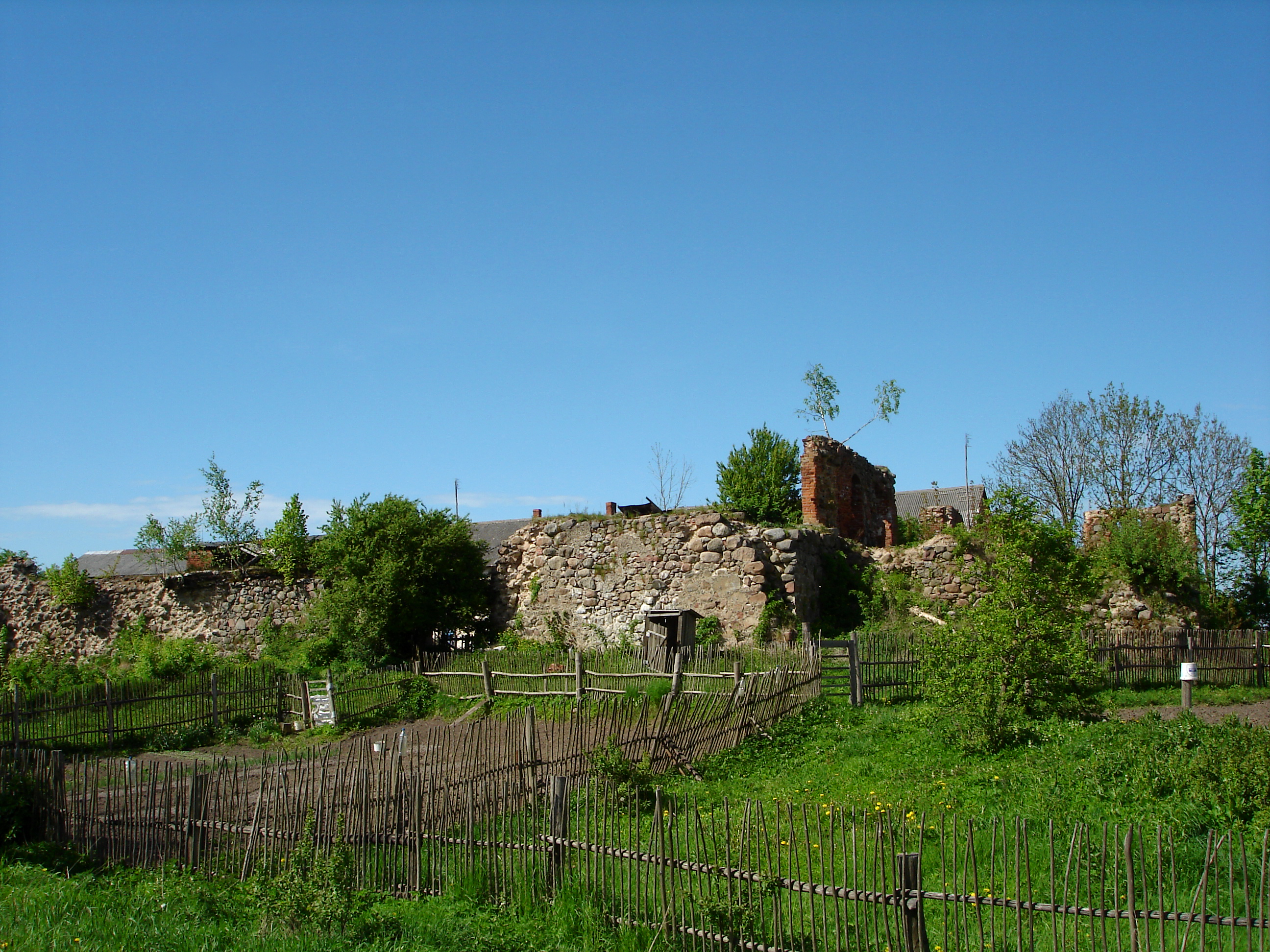
- Castle ruins
- Interactive map of Talpaki
- Location of Talpaki Talpaki (European Russia) Talpaki (Russia)
- Coordinates: 54°39′N 21°20′E
- Country: Russia
- Federal subject: Kaliningrad Oblast
- Administrative district: Gvardeysky District

Population
  - Estimate (2010): 374 )
- Time zone: UTC+2 (MSK–1)
- Postal code: 238214
- OKTMO ID: 27706000236

Talpaki (Russian: Талпáки, German: Taplacken, Polish: Taplaki; Lithuanian: Toplaukiai) is a rural locality (a settlement) in Gvardeysky District of Kaliningrad Oblast, Russia.

European route E77 passes through it.
