= Lesieniec, Lesser Poland Voivodeship =

Lesieniec
- Village
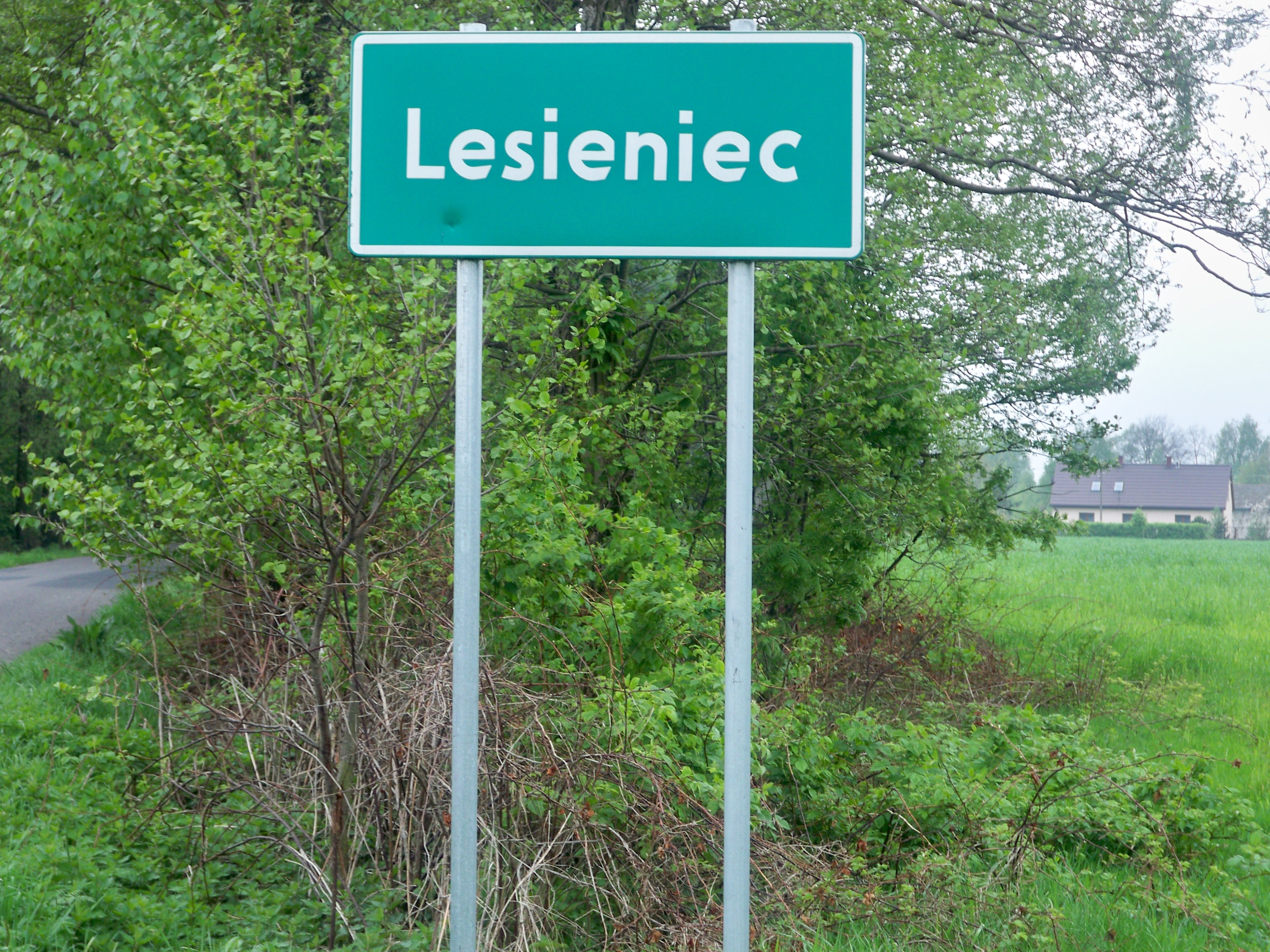

- Location within Poland
- Coordinates: 50°15′N 19°57′E
- Country: Poland
- Voivodeship: Lesser Poland
- County: Kraków
- Gmina: Iwanowice

Lesieniec [lɛˈɕɛɲɛt͡s] is a village in the administrative district of Gmina Iwanowice, within Kraków County, Lesser Poland Voivodeship, in southern Poland.
