= Domiarki =

- Village
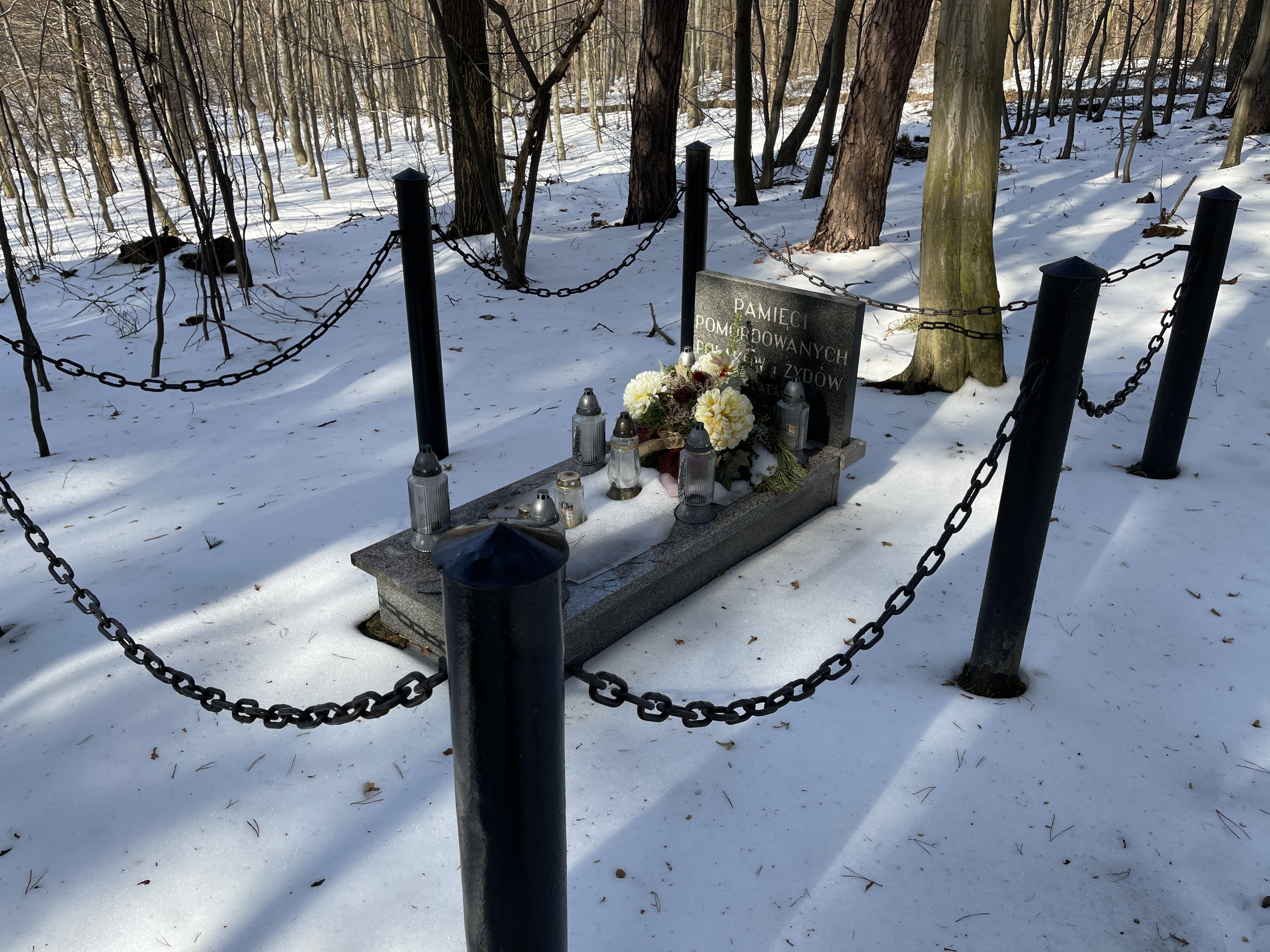
- World War II and Holocaust memorial

- Location within Poland
- Coordinates: 50°13′N 20°1′E
- Country: Poland
- Voivodeship: Lesser Poland
- County: Kraków
- Gmina: Iwanowice

Domiarki [dɔˈmjarki] is a village in the administrative district of Gmina Iwanowice, within Kraków County, Lesser Poland Voivodeship, in southern Poland.
