= Narama =

- Village
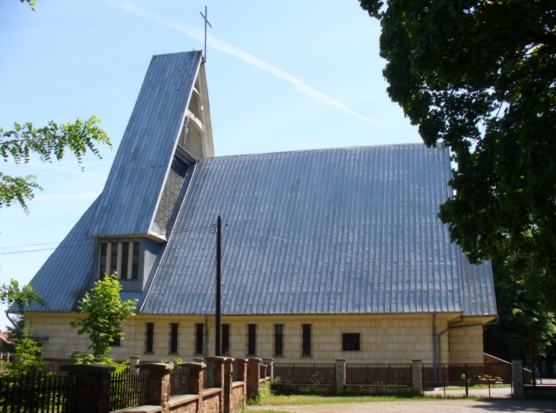
- Catholic church

- Location within Poland
- Coordinates: 50°10′49″N 19°56′2″E
- Country: Poland
- Voivodeship: Lesser Poland
- County: Kraków
- Gmina: Iwanowice

Nowina coat of arms

Narama [naˈrama] is a village in the administrative district of Gmina Iwanowice, within Kraków County, Lesser Poland Voivodeship, in southern Poland.
