= Władysław, Lesser Poland Voivodeship =

Władysław
- Village
- Location within Poland
- Coordinates: 50°16′N 19°58′E
- Country: Poland
- Voivodeship: Lesser Poland
- County: Kraków
- Gmina: Iwanowice

Władysław [vwaˈdɨswaf] is a village in the administrative district of Gmina Iwanowice, within Kraków County, Lesser Poland Voivodeship, in southern Poland.
