= European route E77 =

Road in trans-European E-road network

E77

Major junctions
- North end: Pskov, Russia
- South end: Budapest, Hungary

Location
- Countries: Russia; Estonia; Latvia; Lithuania; Poland; Slovakia; Hungary

Highway system
- International E-road network; A Class; B Class

European route E 77 is a part of the inter-European road system. This Class A intermediate north–south route is 1,690 km (1,050 mi) long and it connects the Baltic Sea with the central part of the continent.

== History ==
In the version of the E-road network established in 1975, E77 was a much shorter road in Hungary from Püspökladány, E60 to Nyíregyháza, which is now part of E573. The section of current E77 between Gdańsk and Budapest was part of E75. When the E77 was first defined in this area, its north end was in Gdańsk.

== Route ==
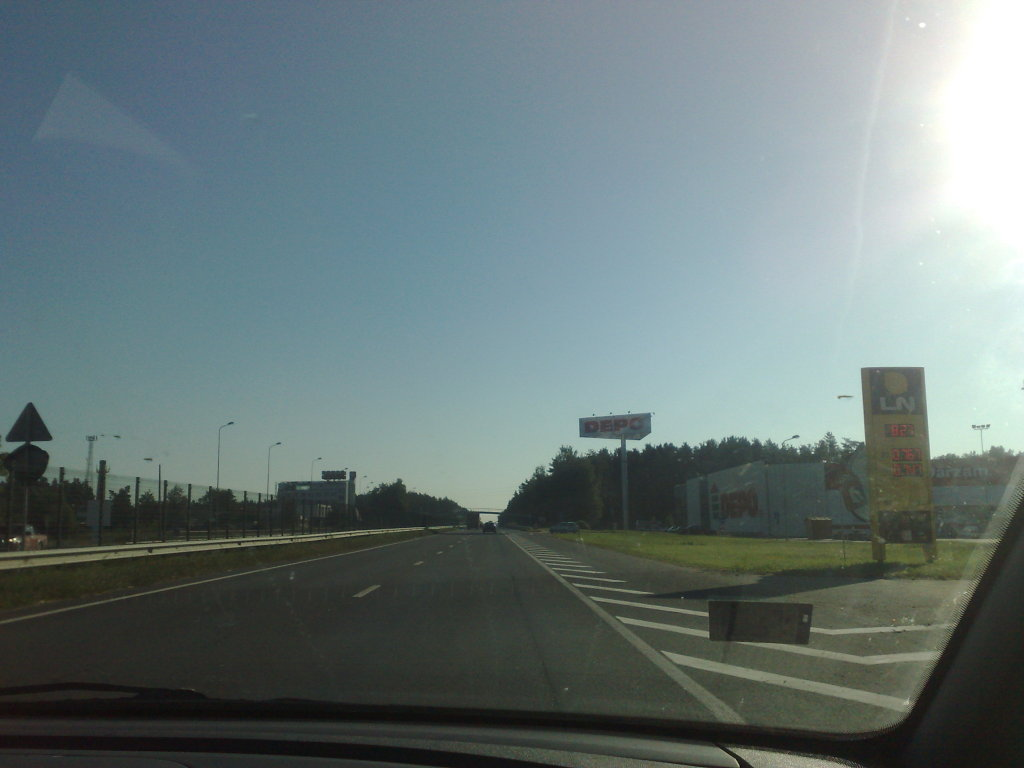
A2 near Riga

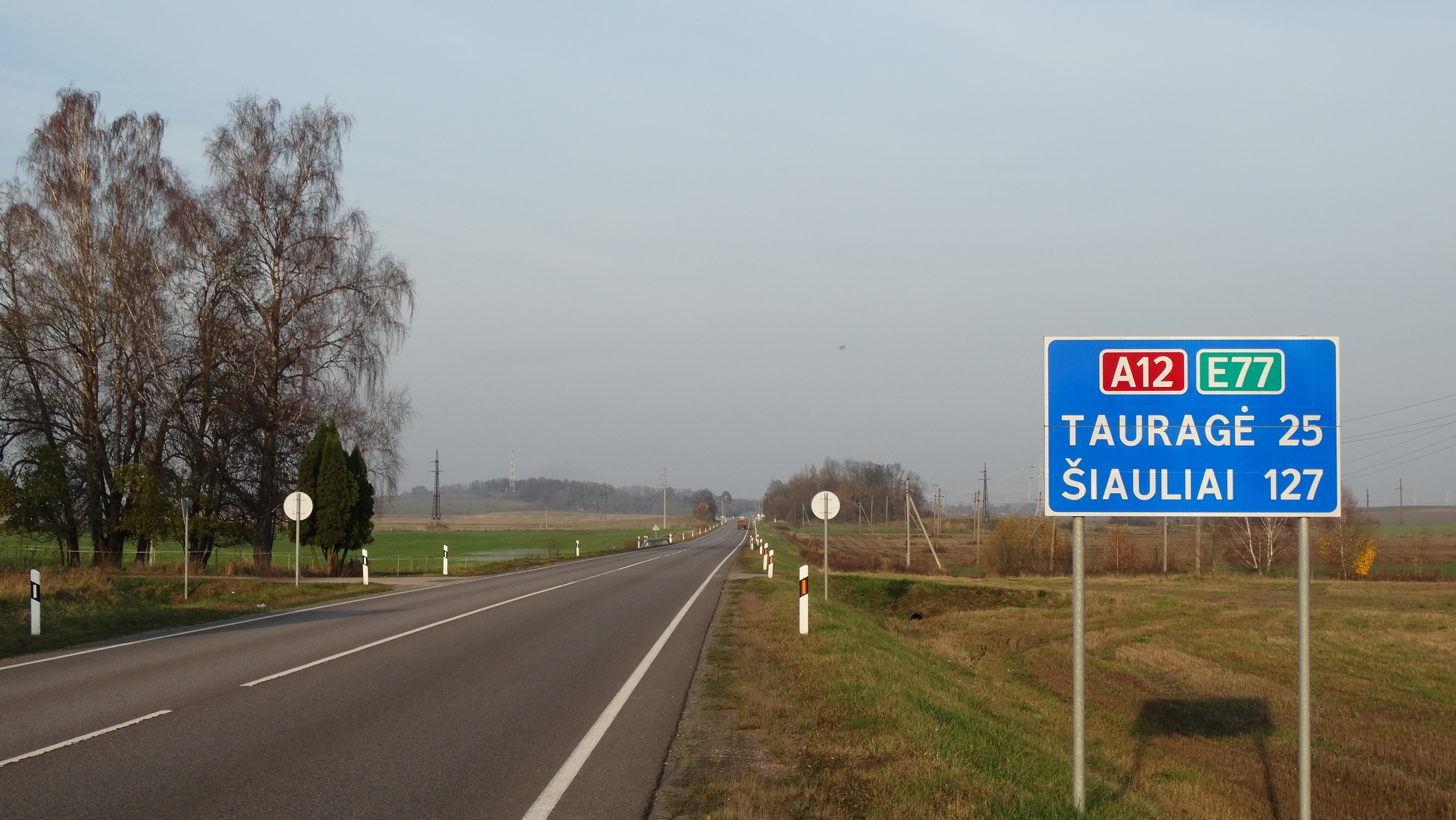
A12 road near Pagėgiai in Lithuania.

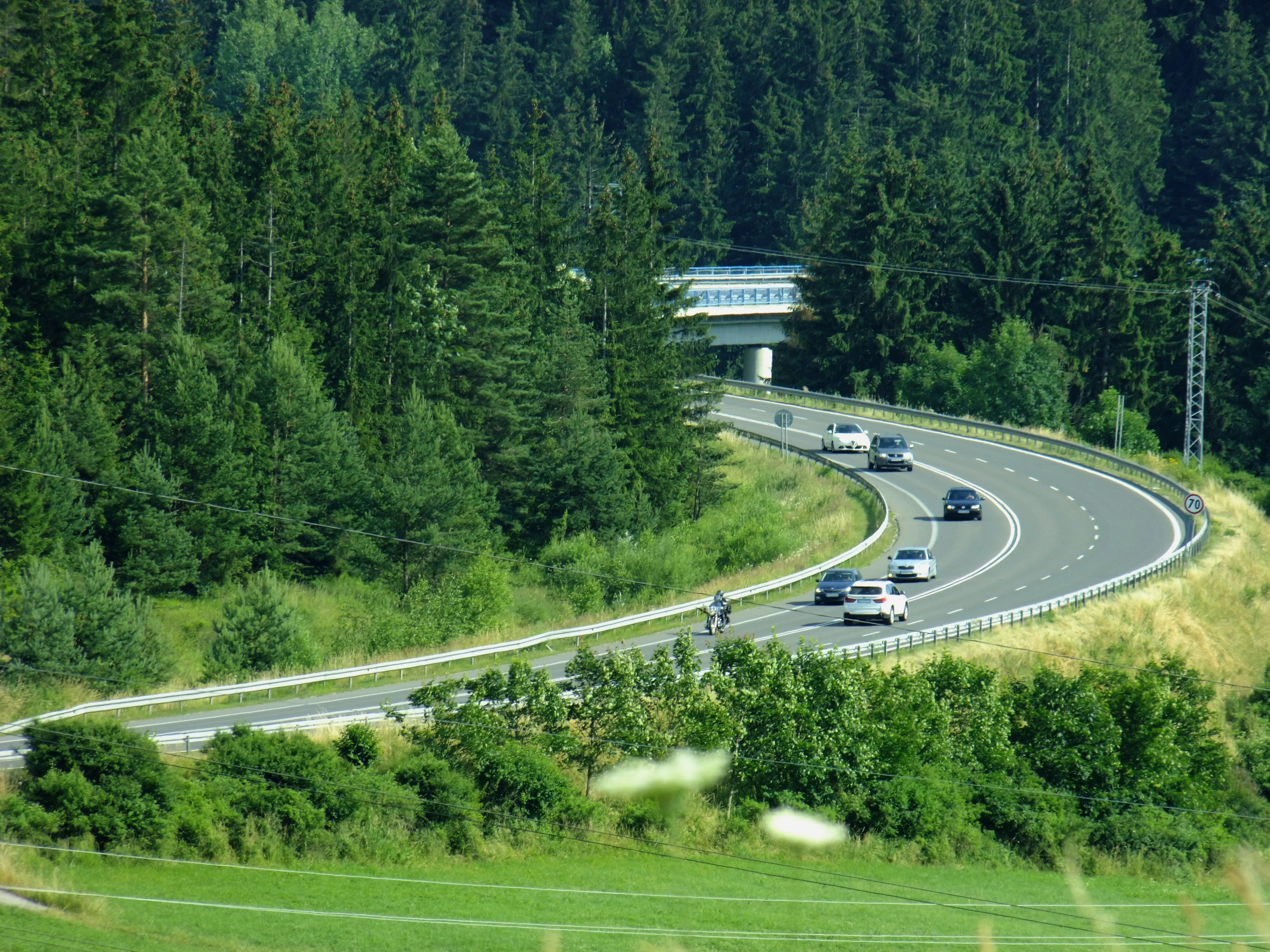
European road E77 between Ružomberok and Dolný Kubín, Slovakia.

The E 77 routes through several European countries. The north end of the road system is in Pskov Oblast in Russia, it passes through Estonia, Latvia, Lithuania, Poland, Slovakia, to the south end in Budapest, Hungary:

Russia (Pskov Oblast)

- A 212: Pskov - Neyolovo - Izborsk - Shumilkino - (Russia) / (Estonia) border checkpoint

Estonia

- T7: (Estonia) / (Russia) border - Määsi - Misso - Käbli - (Estonia) / (Latvia) border

Latvia

- A 2: (Latvia) / (Estonia) border - Grundzāle - Sigulda - Riga
- A 6: Riga
- A 8: Riga - Jelgava - Eleja - (Latvia) / (Lithuania) border

Lithuania

- A 12: (Lithuania) / (Latvia) border - Plikiškiai - Joniškis
- Route 210: Joniškis
- A 12: Joniškis - Šiauliai
- A 18: Šiauliai
- A 12: Šiauliai - Kelmė - Tauragė - Panemune - (Lithuania) / (Russia) border checkpoint

Russia (Kaliningrad Oblast)

- A 216: (Russia) / (Lithuania) border checkpoint - Sovetsk - Talpaki
- A 229: Talpaki - Gvardeysk - Kaliningrad
- 27A-007: within Kaliningrad
- 27A-002: Kaliningrad - Baltiysk

: Kaliningrad - Gdańsk (as no ferry available from Baltiysk)

Poland

- S 7: Gdańsk - Koszwały - Nowy Dwór Gdański - Elbląg - Ostróda - Olsztynek - Nidzica - Mława - Strzegowo - Płońsk
- DK 7: Płońsk - Zakroczym
- S 7: Zakroczym - Czosnów
- DK 7: Czosnów - Warsaw
- S 7 / S 8: Warsaw
- S 7: Warsaw - Grójec - Białobrzegi - Radom - Skarżysko-Kamienna - Kielce - Chęciny - Jędrzejów - Miechów - Widoma
- DK 7: Widoma - Kraków
- A 4: Kraków
- DK 7: Kraków - Myślenice
- S 7: Myślenice - Lubień - Rabka-Zdrój
- DK 7: Rabka-Zdrój - Jabłonka - (Poland) / (Slovakia) border

Slovakia

- I/59: (Poland) / (Slovakia) border - Trstená
- R3: Trstená- Nižná
- I/59: Nižna - Dolný Kubín - Ružomberok - Banská Bystrica
- R1 / I/66: Banská Bystrica - Zvolen
- I/66: Zvolen
- I/16: Zvolen
- I/66: Zvolen - Devičie - Šahy - (Slovakia) / (Hungary) border

Hungary

- 2: (Slovakia) / (Hungary) border - Hont - Rétság - Vác
- M2: Vác - Budapest
- M0: Budapest

== Improvements ==
A bypass to the east of Panemunė and Sovetsk, incorporating new border control points and a new bridge over the Neman River, is under construction. After completion it will become part of the E77.
