= Zagaje, Kraków County =

Zagaje
- Village
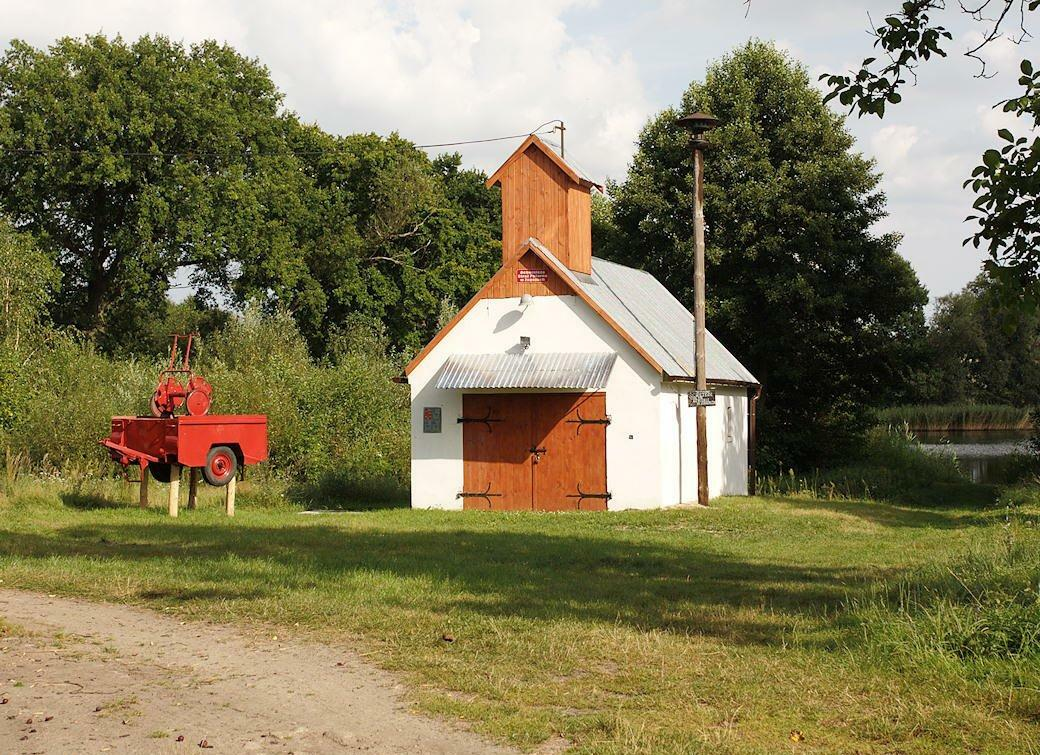
- Fire station

- Location within Poland
- Coordinates: 50°14′36″N 19°56′20″E
- Country: Poland
- Voivodeship: Lesser Poland
- County: Kraków
- Gmina: Iwanowice

Zagaje [zaˈɡajɛ] is a village in the administrative district of Gmina Iwanowice, within Kraków County, Lesser Poland Voivodeship, in southern Poland.
