= Poskwitów Stary =

- Village
- Location within Poland
- Coordinates: 50°12′47″N 20°0′34″E
- Country: Poland
- Voivodeship: Lesser Poland
- County: Kraków
- Gmina: Iwanowice

Poskwitów Stary [pɔskˈfituf ˈstarɨ] is a village in the administrative district of Gmina Iwanowice, within Kraków County, Lesser Poland Voivodeship, in southern Poland.
