= Expressway S7 (Poland) =

Expressway in Poland connecting Gdańsk, Warsaw, Cracow and Tatra Mountains

Expressway S7
- Droga ekspresowa S7

Route information
- Part of E77
- Length: 635 km (395 mi) 720 km (447 mi) planned

Major junctions
- North end: S 6 near Gdańsk
- S 22 near Elbląg S 5 near Ostróda (planned) S 51 near Olsztyn S 50 near Płońsk (planned); S 8 / S 2 in Warsaw S 12 near Radom S 74 near Kielce A 4 near Kraków
- South end: DK 7 near Rabka

Location
- Country: Poland
- Major cities: Gdynia, Gdańsk, Elbląg, Warsaw, Radom, Skarżysko-Kamienna, Kielce, Kraków

Highway system
- National roads in Poland; Voivodeship roads
| ← S 6 | → S 8 |

Expressway S7 or express road S7 (Polish: Droga ekspresowa S7) is a Polish highway which has been planned to run from Gdynia on the Baltic coast through Gdańsk, Elbląg, Warsaw, Radom, Kielce and Kraków to Rabka near the border with Slovakia. It is being constructed partially by upgrading national road 7 and partially on new alignment. The construction is co-financed by the European Union funding. The total planned length of S7 is 720 km (450 mi), of which 635 km (395 mi) has been built and further 15 km (9.3 mi) is under construction as of July 2026.

== Route ==
The section from Gdynia through Gdańsk to Czosnów (352 km) is completed. From Czosnów to Warsaw (24 km) a dual-carriageway national road 7 from the 1970s (with traffic lights and pedestrian crossings) is used for traffic, and it is partially under reconstruction into S7. The 2+2 profile (two lanes per each direction) is provided on whole length of the reconstruction site. In Warsaw, S7 has concurrency with S2 and S8.

From Warsaw to Kraków (281 km) the expressway is open to traffic, providing an unbroken expressway connection between Poland's two largest cities. Near the Kraków Mistrzejowice interchange under construction (connecting S7 with S52) only a single carriageway of S7 is open to traffic and only selected relations at the interchange are available. In Kraków, S7 has concurrency with A4.

Between Kraków and Myślenice (25 km) the existing dual-carriageway national road 7 serves the traffic and it is partially under reconstruction into a grade-separated highway (2 lanes in the southbound direction and 1 lane in the northbound direction are open to traffic on the reconstruction site). A new separate route of S7 is planned to be constructed on this section in unspecified future. Between Myślenice and Rabka-Zdrój S7 is open, which includes the Zakopianka tunnel. In 2020, it was announced that a dual-carriageway extension of S7 from Rabka-Zdrój to the Polish-Slovak border will be constructed, set to be finished by 2033. At the border it will connect to the planned R3 expressway.

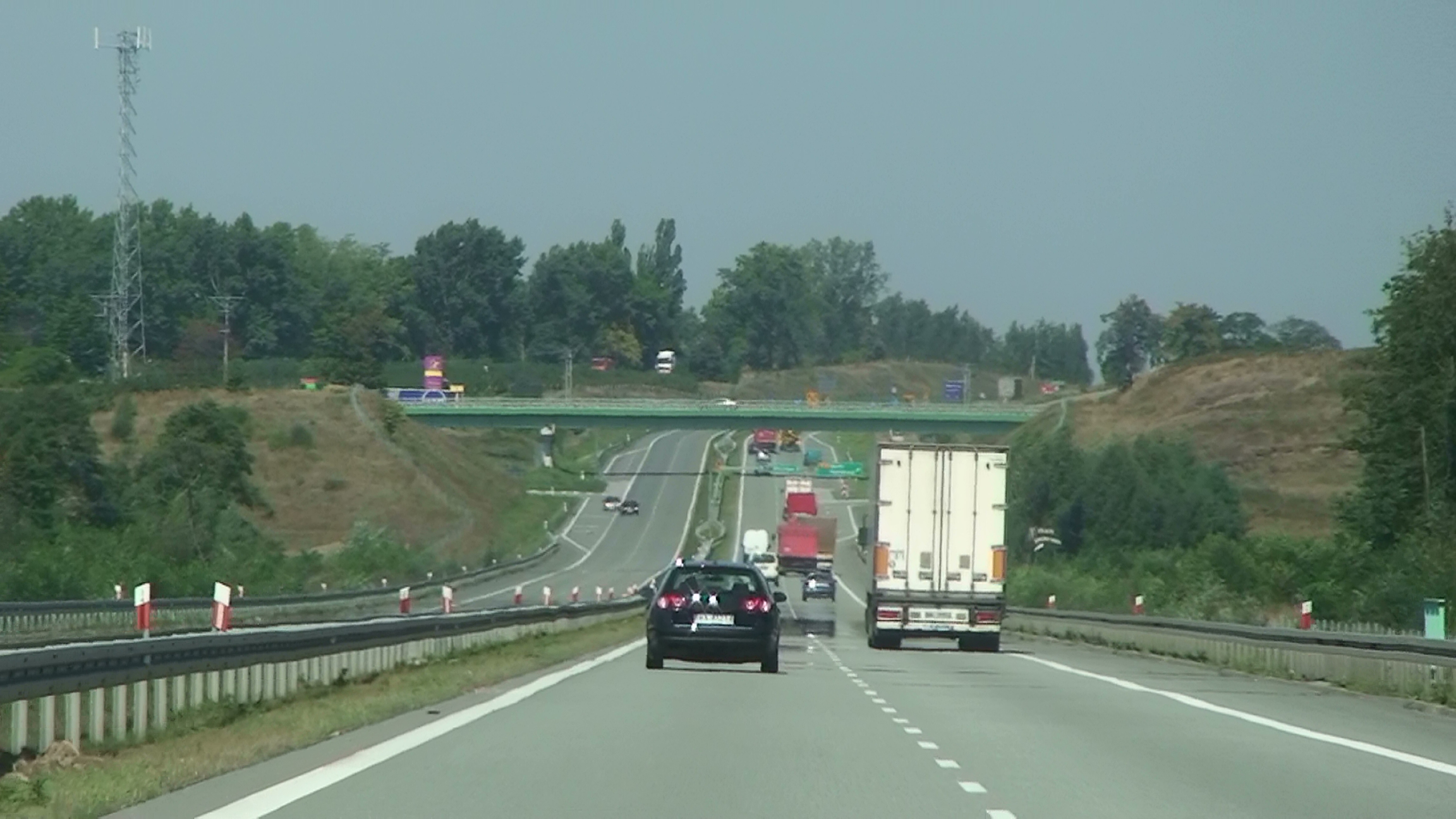
S7 near Białobrzegi

== See also ==
- Highways in Poland
- European route E77
