= Poskwitów =

- Village
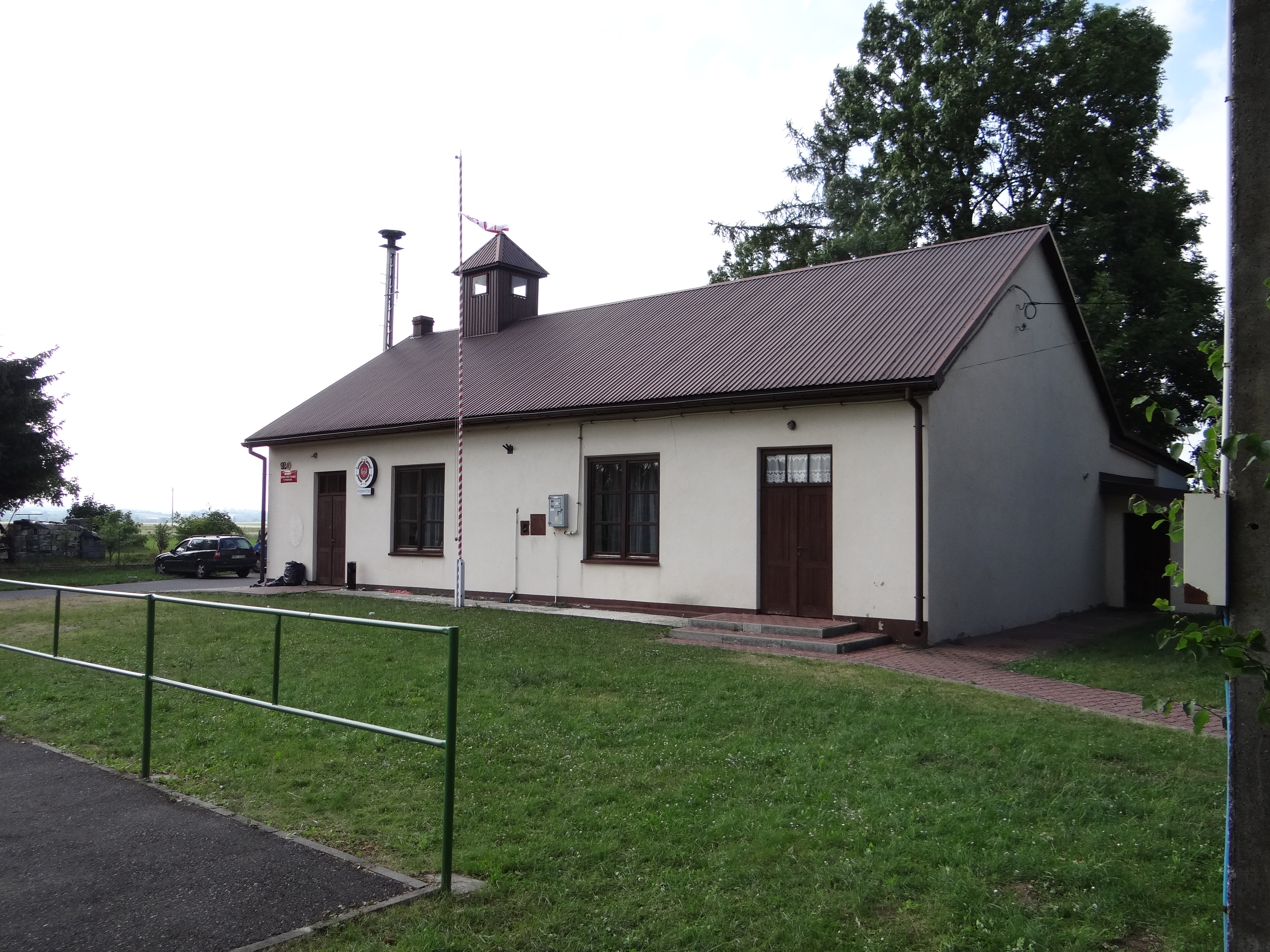
- Fire station

- Location within Poland
- Coordinates: 50°13′22″N 20°0′22″E
- Country: Poland
- Voivodeship: Lesser Poland
- County: Kraków
- Gmina: Iwanowice
- Population: 480

Poskwitów [pɔskˈfituf] is a village in the administrative district of Gmina Iwanowice, within Kraków County, Lesser Poland Voivodeship, in southern Poland.
