= A12 highway (Lithuania) =

Road in Lithuania

A12
- Riga-Šiauliai-Tauragė-Kaliningrad

Route information
- Part of E77
- Length: 186.09 km (115.63 mi)

Major junctions
- From: Plikiškės; Latvia; E77 / A 8
- To: Panemunė; Russia E77 / A 216 / A 198

Location
- Country: Lithuania
- Major cities: Joniškis, Šiauliai, Tauragė

Highway system
- Transport in Lithuania

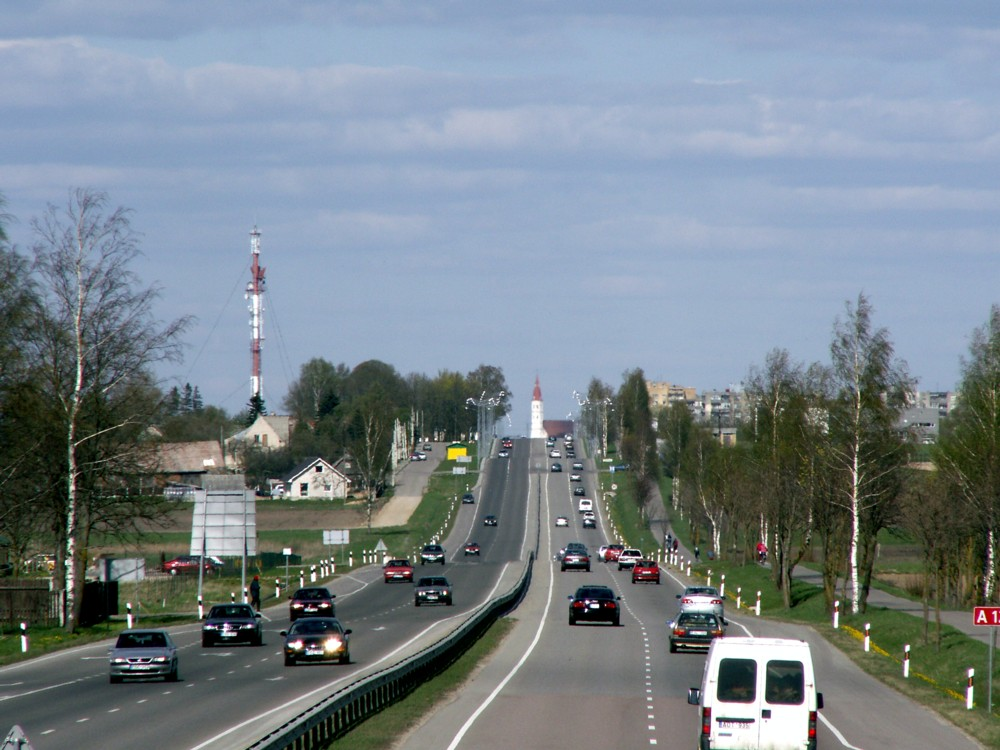
Dual-carriageway section just off limits of Šiauliai

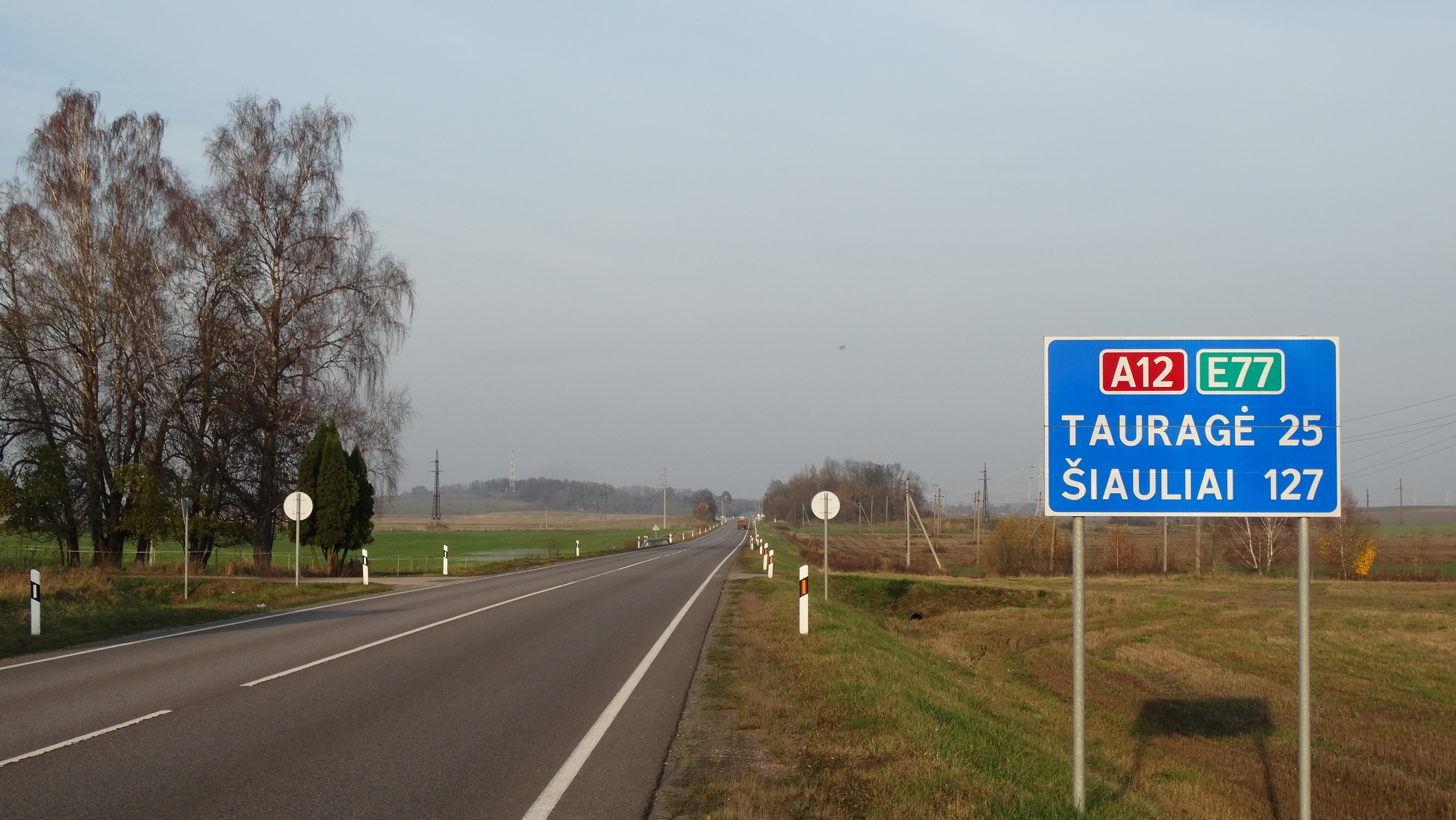
A12 road near the border with Kaliningrad Oblast (Russia) heading to Tauragė.

The A12 highway is a highway in Lithuania (Magistralinis kelias). It forms part of the road connecting Riga and Kaliningrad (highway E77) Road passes through Joniškis, Šiauliai and Tauragė. The length of the road is 186.09 km.

The speed limit for most of the road length is 90 km/h. There is short 10 km dual-carriageway section south of Šiauliai. The alternative name for the road is Via Hanzeatica as the road was an important transportation corridor between cities of the Hanseatic League, Riga and current-day Kaliningrad. It is one of two of the most important land roads to Kaliningrad Oblast from Lithuanian side.(The other one is the A7). This ends at the Queen Louise Bridge.
