= Stary Krasieniec =

- Village
- Location within Poland
- Coordinates: 50°12′26″N 19°56′15″E
- Country: Poland
- Voivodeship: Lesser Poland
- County: Kraków
- Gmina: Iwanowice
- Population: 300

Stary Krasieniec [ˈstarɨ kraˈɕɛɲɛt͡s] is a village in the administrative district of Gmina Iwanowice, within Kraków County, Lesser Poland Voivodeship, in southern Poland.
