= Iwanowice Dworskie =

- Village
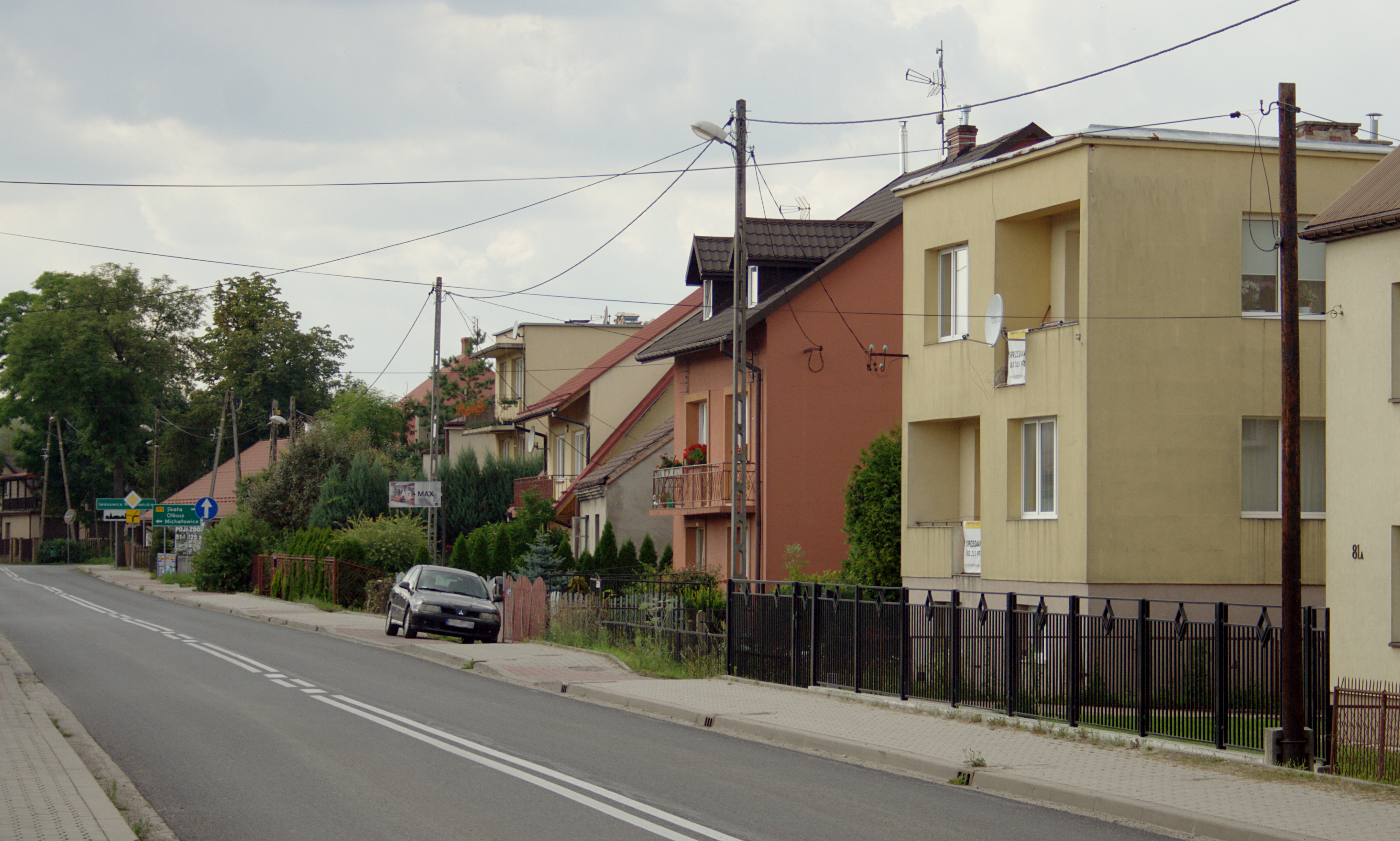

- Location within Poland
- Coordinates: 50°13′15″N 19°58′45″E
- Country: Poland
- Voivodeship: Lesser Poland
- County: Kraków
- Gmina: Iwanowice
- Population: 410

Iwanowice Dworskie [ivanɔˈvit͡sɛ ˈdvɔrskʲɛ] is a village in the administrative district of Gmina Iwanowice, within Kraków County, Lesser Poland Voivodeship, in southern Poland.
