= Gmina Iwanowice =

Gmina Iwanowice Iwanowice Commune
- Gmina
- Coat of arms
- Interactive map of Gmina Iwanowice
- Coordinates (Iwanowice): 50°13′38″N 19°57′25″E
- Country: Poland
- Voivodeship: Lesser Poland
- County: Kraków County
- Seat: Iwanowice

Area
  - Total: 70.62 km^{2} (27.27 sq mi)

Population (2006)
  - Total: 8,292
  - Density: 117.4/km^{2} (304.1/sq mi)
- Website: http://www.iwanowice.malopolska.pl/

Gmina Iwanowice is a rural gmina (administrative district) in Kraków County, Lesser Poland Voivodeship, in southern Poland. Its seat is the village of Iwanowice, which lies approximately 19 kilometres (12 mi) north of the regional capital Kraków.

The gmina covers an area of 70.62 square kilometres (27.3 sq mi), and as of 2006 its total population is 8,292.

The gmina contains part of the protected area called Dłubnia Landscape Park.

== Villages ==
Gmina Iwanowice contains the villages and settlements of Biskupice, Celiny, Damice, Domiarki, Grzegorzowice Małe, Grzegorzowice Wielkie, Iwanowice, Iwanowice Dworskie, Krasieniec Zakupny, Lesieniec, Maszków, Narama, Poskwitów, Poskwitów Stary, Przestańsko, Sieciechowice, Stary Krasieniec, Sułkowice, Widoma, Władysław, Zagaje, Zalesie and Żerkowice.

== Neighbouring gminas ==
Gmina Iwanowice is bordered by the gminas of Gołcza, Kocmyrzów-Luborzyca, Michałowice, Skała, Słomniki and Zielonki.
