= Biskupice, Kraków County =

Biskupice
- Village
- Location within Poland
- Coordinates: 50°13′56″N 19°59′00″E
- Country: Poland
- Voivodeship: Lesser Poland
- County: Kraków
- Gmina: Iwanowice

Biskupice [biskuˈpit͡sɛ] is a village in the administrative district of Gmina Iwanowice, within Kraków County, Lesser Poland Voivodeship, in southern Poland.
