= Sułkowice, Kraków County =

Sułkowice
- Village
- Location within Poland
- Coordinates: 50°14′N 19°56′E
- Country: Poland
- Voivodeship: Lesser Poland
- County: Kraków
- Gmina: Iwanowice

Sułkowice [suu̯kɔˈvit͡sɛ] is a village in the administrative district of Gmina Iwanowice, within Kraków County, Lesser Poland Voivodeship, in southern Poland.
