= National road 7 (Poland) =

National road in Poland

National Road 7
- Droga krajowa nr 7
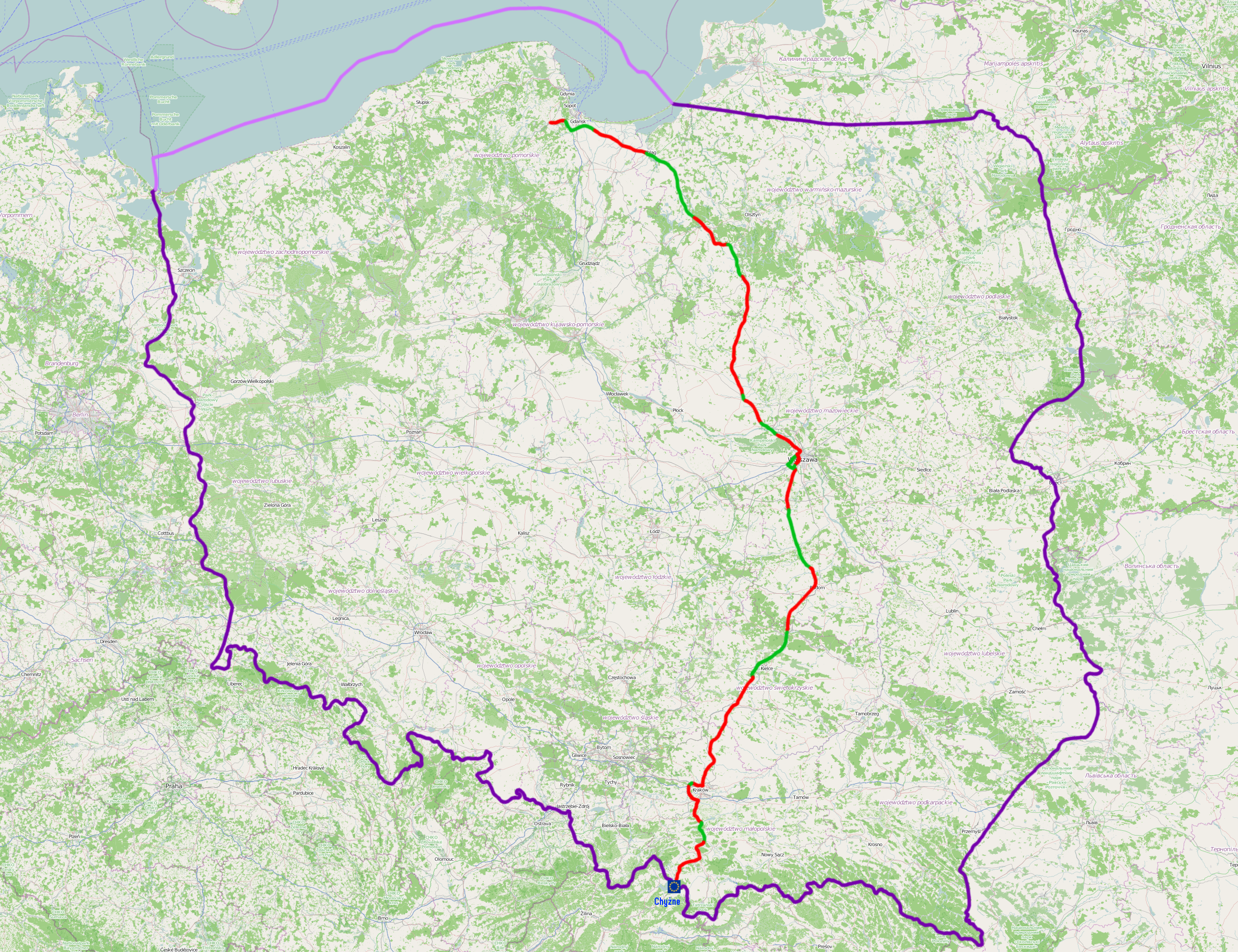
- DK 7 and S7 in Poland Trunk road standard Expressway standard Concurrent with Autostrada A4

Route information
- Part of European route E77
- Maintained by GDDKiA
- Length: 780 km (480 mi)
- Existed: 1985–present

Major junctions
- From: Żukowo near Gdańsk
- To: Chyżne border crossing

Location
- Country: Poland
- Regions: Pomerania; Masuria; Masovia; Holy Cross; Lesser Poland
- Major cities: Gdańsk, Elbląg, Ostróda, Warsaw, Radom, Kielce, Kraków, Zakopane

Highway system
- National roads in Poland; Voivodeship roads
← DK 6	→ DK 8

National road 7 (Polish: Droga krajowa nr 7, abbreviated as DK 7) is a route of the Polish national roads network running from Żukowo near Gdańsk, through Warsaw and Kraków to the border with Slovakia at Chyżne. The entire length of the road forms the Polish part of the European route E77. Between Gdańsk and Elbląg it is also a part of the European route E28.

Since the beginning of the 1990s, segments of the DK 7 are being gradually rebuilt to expressway standards and form parts of the Expressway S7. A section forming the beltway of Kraków is concurrent with the Autostrada A4 motorway.

A segment of the road from Kraków to Rabka Zdrój together with the National road 47 continuing from there to the popular tourist resort Zakopane in the Tatra Mountains is commonly referred to as Zakopianka.

Prior to its modernization, the DK 7 was the most dangerous road in Poland along with DK 1. In 2007 there were 765 road accidents on DK 7, with 170 people dead and 1157 injured. The following year the accident count dropped to 696. DK7 is planned to be a four-lane road in the following years as of 2023 directly connected with the S7 Expressway.

Parts of the road are concurrent with pre-war German Reichsstraße 128 and 130.
