= A7 highway (Lithuania) =

Highway in Lithuania

A7
- Marijampolė-Vilkaviškis-Kybartai

Route information
- Part of E28
- Length: 42.21 km (26.23 mi)

Major junctions
- From: Marijampolė
- To: Kybartai; Russia E28 / A 229

Location
- Country: Lithuania
- Major cities: Vilkaviškis, Virbalis, Kybartai

Highway system
- Transport in Lithuania

The A7 highway is a highway in Lithuania (Magistralinis kelias). It connects Marijampolė and Russian border (Kaliningrad Oblast) near Kybartai. From there, the road continues to Kaliningrad. The length of the road is 42.21 km. Major cities near the road are Vilkaviškis, Virbalis and Kybartai.

The speed limit along most of the road length is 90 km/h. It is one of two of the most important land roads to Kaliningrad Oblast from Lithuanian side. The other one is E77 (A12 highway in Lithuania) that crosses border near Pagėgiai.

This route is a part of International E-road network (part of European route E28).

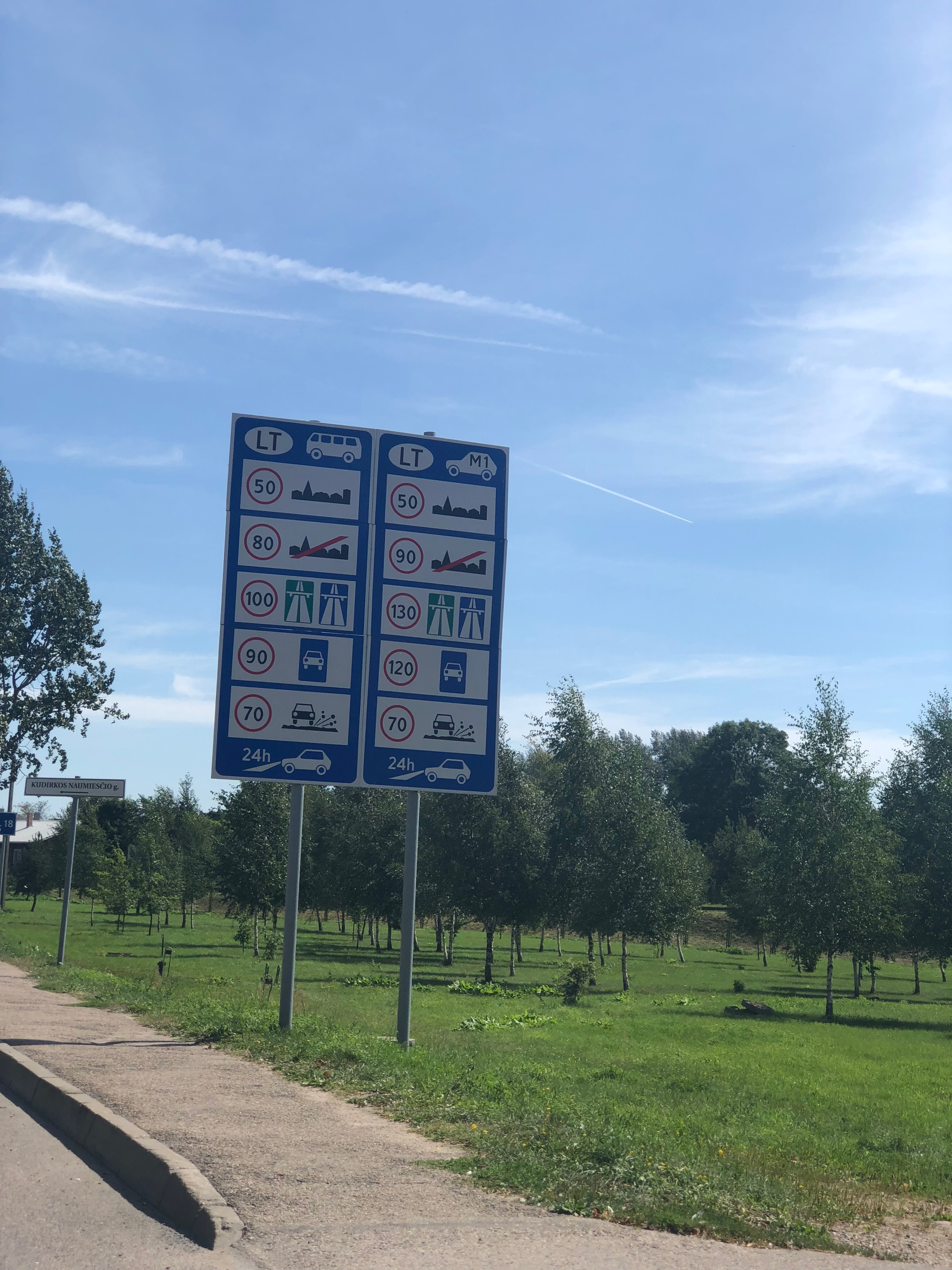
Lithuanian border
