= MISA =

MISA may refer to:

- Maintenance of Internal Security Act, an act of Parliament in India
- Media Institute of Southern Africa, a media watch-dog organisation across Southern Africa
