= Sieciechowice, Kraków County =

Sieciechowice
- Village
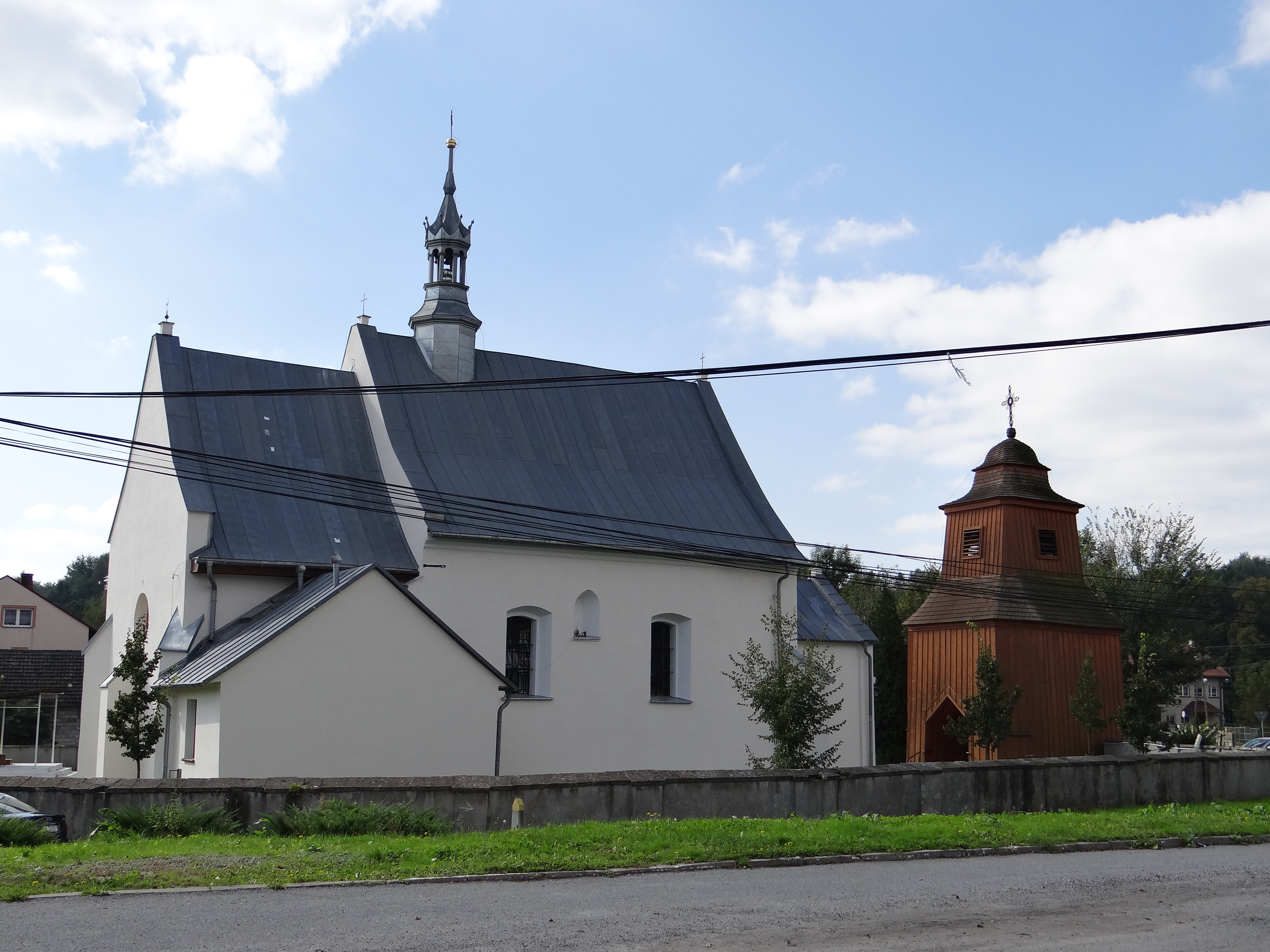
- St. Andrew church

- Location within Poland
- Coordinates: 50°14′N 19°58′E
- Country: Poland
- Voivodeship: Lesser Poland
- County: Kraków
- Gmina: Iwanowice

Sieciechowice [ɕɛt͡ɕɛxɔˈvit͡sɛ] is a village in the administrative district of Gmina Iwanowice, within Kraków County, Lesser Poland Voivodeship, in southern Poland.
