= Misa, Lucknow =

Village in Uttar Pradesh, India

Sengta Meesa Sengta Meesa
- Village
- Location in Uttar Pradesh, India Sengta Meesa (India)
- Coordinates: 26.80724°N 81.09806°E
- Country: India
- State: Uttar Pradesh
- District: Lucknow

Area
  - Total: 2.601 km^{2} (1.004 sq mi)
- Elevation: 117 m (384 ft)

Population (2011)
  - Total: 2,861
  - Density: 1,100/km^{2} (2,849/sq mi)

Languages
  - Official: Hindi
- Time zone: UTC+5:30 (IST)

Sengta Meesa, also spelled Sengta Meesa, is a village in Gosainganj block of Lucknow district, Uttar Pradesh, India. As of 2011, its population is 2,861, in 557 households.
