= Maszków, Lesser Poland Voivodeship =

Maszków
- Village
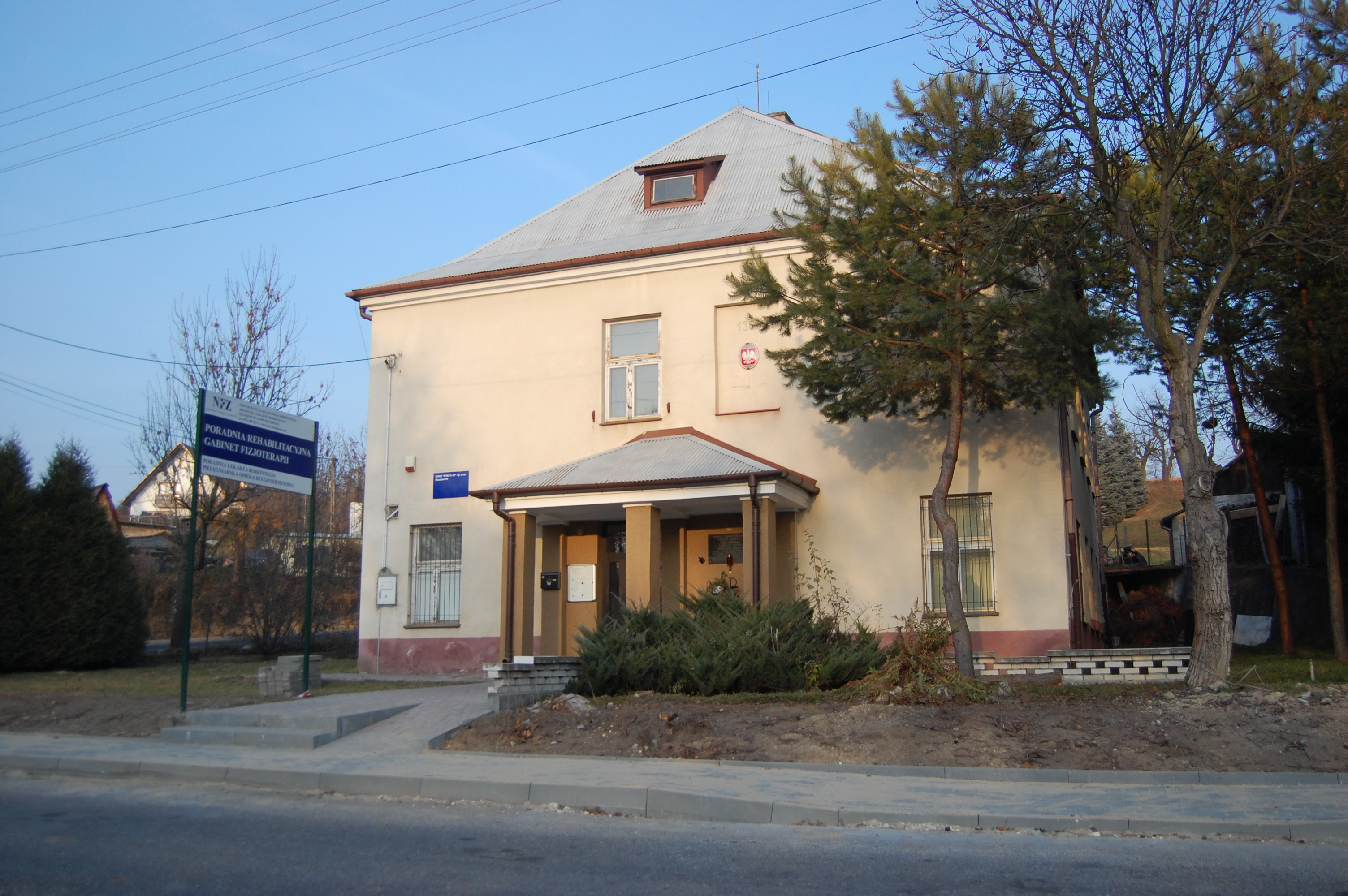
- School

- Location within Poland
- Coordinates: 50°12′N 19°59′E
- Country: Poland
- Voivodeship: Lesser Poland
- County: Kraków
- Gmina: Iwanowice

Maszków [ˈmaʂkuf] is a village in the administrative district of Gmina Iwanowice, within Kraków County, Lesser Poland Voivodeship, in southern Poland.
