= Widoma =

- Village
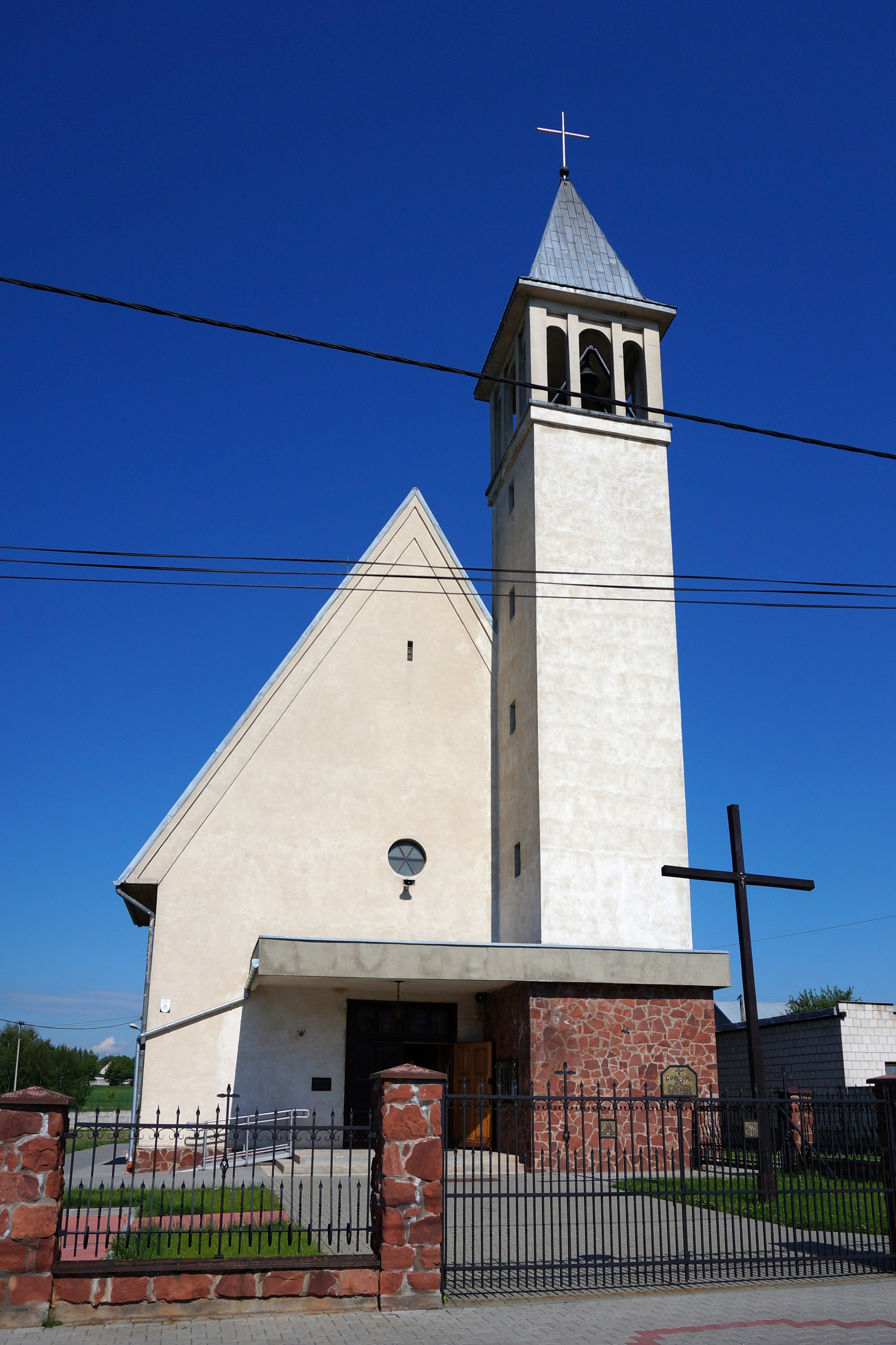
- Local Catholic church

- Location within Poland
- Coordinates: 50°12′N 20°1′E
- Country: Poland
- Voivodeship: Lesser Poland
- County: Kraków
- Gmina: Iwanowice

Widoma [viˈdɔma] is a village in the administrative district of Gmina Iwanowice, within Kraków County, Lesser Poland Voivodeship, in southern Poland.
