= Żerkowice, Lesser Poland Voivodeship =

Żerkowice
- Village
- Location within Poland
- Coordinates: 50°11′29″N 19°57′21″E
- Country: Poland
- Voivodeship: Lesser Poland
- County: Kraków
- Gmina: Iwanowice

Żerkowice [ʐɛrkɔˈvit͡sɛ] is a village in the administrative district of Gmina Iwanowice, within Kraków County, Lesser Poland Voivodeship, in southern Poland.
