= Misa Tamagawa =

Radio show host from Osaka, Japan

Misa Tamagawa (玉川 美沙)
- Born: 28 February 1971 (age 55); Japan 大阪府大東市
- Presenting career
- Show: Jay Land Shuffle (1994) King's Brunch (1997); NACK WITH YOU (1997); The Nutty Radio Show Onitama (鬼玉) (2003); Misa Tamagawa's Tamanavi (2006) Misa Tamagawa's Happily (2011)
- Country: Japan

Misa Tamagawa (玉川 美沙) is a radio show host from Osaka, Japan. She is known for previously hosting "The Nutty Radio Show Onitama" on NACK5 and "Misa Tamagawa's Tamanavi" on JOQR.

== Radio ==
Tamagawa became a host on Jay Land Shuffle starting April 1997 on FM Osaka. At the age of 26, she moved to Tokyo and appeared on NACK5's "NACK WITH YOU", an FM station in Saitama Prefecture. She also worked as a first music commentator for King's Brunch on TBS TV.

Since April 2003, she was one of the main personalities on "The Nutty Radio Show Onitama", the main nighttime program on NACK5 for seven and a half years. In April 2006, she started "Misa Tamagawa's Tamanavi", an evening program on JOQR at the same time as "Onitama".

In June 2008, she represented JOQR at the hanging poster for the "Tokyo 5 Companies Radio Enhancement Campaign".

In March 2010, The Japan Commercial Broadcasters Association (JBA) conducted a survey of 101 commercial radio stations nationwide. In the 2010 "Joy, Anger, Sorrow, and Pleasure" survey, she ranked first place in the "Sorrow... Which famous person's voice soothes you when you are sad?" category. In the same survey, she ranked second place in the two categories "Which celebrity has a voice that makes you happy just by listening to it?" and "Who are the famous people whose laughter is fun to listen to?".

After her maternity leave, Tamagawa returned to JOQR on the Saturday morning wide program "Misa Tamagawa's Happily" in April 2013, which won the "Excellence Award" for its "Happily Classic" corner, as it was "created with all the performers and staff working together to make things more enjoyable".

Tamagawa supervised Thursdays on the JFN network in 2018 and "Misa Tamagawa's Music Selection".

In June 2019, she began streaming on YouTube. Currently, she regularly broadcasts "玉川美沙tama_ch.radio" and "Ohatama Radio" via 17Live and Twitcasting.

== Personal life ==
Tamagawa has been involved in music since her childhood; she learned the electronic organ at the age of four, and in elementary and junior high school, she was a member of the music and brass band clubs, the latter of which she was the head in junior high school. She also belonged to a copy band and played keyboard.

Tamagawa obtained a shōchū advisor certificate in 2002, and published a book, Rakuraku Shochu (楽楽焼酎), in 2003.

In 2007, she wrote the lyrics for the song "Snack," which appears on the album Burn Park (バーンパーク) by Kakashi.

In June 2010, Tamagawa reported on "Misa Tamagawa's Tamanavi" that she married a younger man. In August, she announced that she was six months pregnant. After that, she left all of her regular programs. On January 14, 2011, she announced on her blog that she had given birth to her first child, a boy.

In the 2010s, Tamagawa publicly announced on her blog that she was a train fan, and in 2015, she participated in a national high school model train contest. In 2015, she participated in a national model railroad contest for high school students, where she held a fundraising event to restore a section of the Tadami Line that was closed to traffic.

In June 2010, she started "Tamanavi Farm" in Kamikawa, Saitama, as a project of "Misa Tamagawa's Tamanavi". "Tamanavi Farm" ended with its parent program.

In March 2011, when Tamagawa was looking for something to do after the Great East Japan Earthquake, she received a message from a listener asking her to make a picture book for children to read to adults. In response, she created a collaborative picture book, Protect You, with picture book author Mari Torigoe as part of Operation Toritama.
