= Plikiškiai =

Village in Lithuania

Coordinates: 56°20′10″N 23°39′50″E

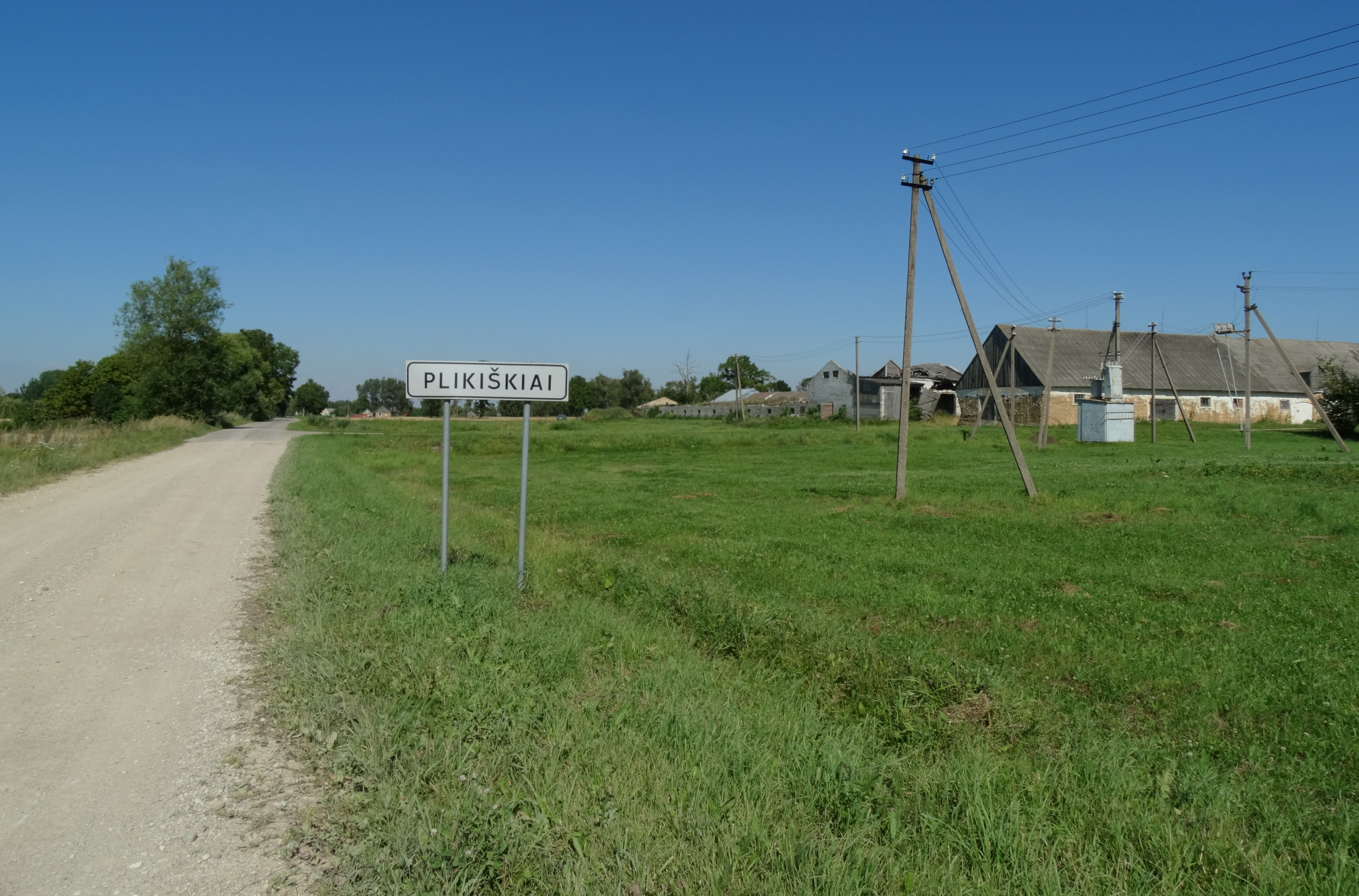
Road sign to the village

Plikiškiai is a village in Joniškis District Municipality, Šiauliai County, Lithuania. The village was already known in 1658 and had 16 residential courtyards. In 2011, Plikiškiai had 257 inhabitants.
