= Panemunė =

- City
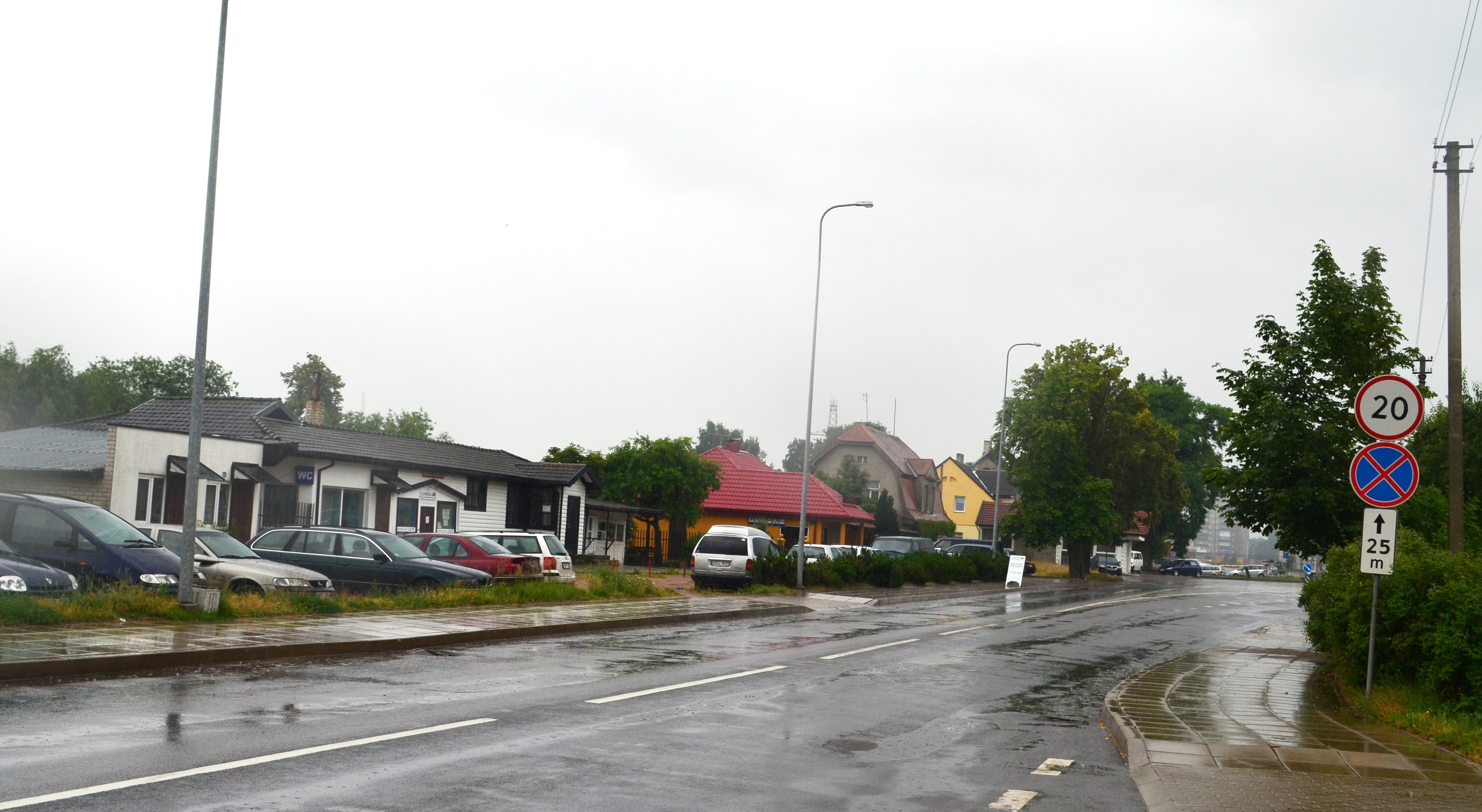
- The main street of Panemunė
- Interactive map of Panemunė
- Location of Panemunė
- Coordinates: 55°6′0″N 21°54′0″E
- Country: Lithuania
- Ethnographic region: Lithuania Minor
- County: Tauragė County
- Municipality: Pagėgiai municipality
- Eldership: Pagėgiai eldership
- Granted town rights: 1837

Population (2020)
  - Total: 194
- Time zone: UTC+2 (EET)
  - Summer (DST): UTC+3 (EEST)

Panemunė (Lithuanian: [ˈpanɛmunɛ]; German: Übermemel) is the smallest settlement with city status in Lithuania. It is situated on the banks of the Nemunas River opposite Sovetsk, 8 km (5.0 mi) south from Pagėgiai, in Tauragė County. It is a border checkpoint for traffic to and from Russia (Kaliningrad Oblast).

The Queen Louise Bridge originally built in 1907 links Panemunė to the city of Sovetsk (Tilsit until 1946) just south across the river. The landmark arch now lies on the Russian side.

The city is known as the smallest official city in Lithuania, despite its tiny population.

== History ==
The area comprising today's Panemunė used to be the northern trans-Memel (Neman) suburb of Tilsit, then a Prussian and later also German town (as of 1871). Tilsit sat close to the border between Germany and Russia.

After Germany's defeat in World War I, the trans-Memel suburb was disentangled from Tilsit (with the rest of the Memelland/Klaipėda Region detached from the Province of East Prussia) in 1920. The suburb was given the name Übermemel, which means over the Memel river in German.

French administered the area pursuant to the Treaty of Versailles, establishing the League of Nations mandate of Memel/Klaipėda. In 1923 the restored Lithuania annexed the Memelland after the Klaipėda Revolt and Übermemel was given the name Panemunė. Germany re-acquired Panemunė (with all of Memelland) on 23 March 1939 – its last peaceful territorial gain before the Second World War. So Panemunė (Übermemel) was reintegrated into the city of Tilsit.

Following World War II, the whole area was seized by the Soviet Union and in 1947 Übermemel, renamed as Panemunė (like all the Klaipėda Region), was returned to then Soviet-occupied Lithuania. The town's German minority was expelled.

== Border crossing ==
A new bridge over the Neman river with the bypass roads around the towns was built in 2015. The existing border crossing over the historic Queen Louise Bridge will be for pedestrian use only.

== Population ==
2021 - 217

2011 - 274

2001 - 329

== See also ==
- Panemunė Castle, 80 km to the east, in the municipality Vytėnai
