= Lilaste =

Lilaste can refer to:

- Lilaste, a river in Ādaži Municipality and Saulkrasti Municipality, Latvia
- Lilaste, a village in Carnikava Parish, Ādaži Municipality
- Lilaste, a village in Saulkrasti Parish, Saulkrasti Municipality
- Lilaste Station, a railway station near Lilaste in Ādaži Municipality
- Lilaste, a lake in Latvia
