= A4 road (Latvia) =

Road in Latvia

Coordinates: 56.931516°N 24.388142°E

A4
- Rīgas apvedceļš

Route information
- Part of E22 E67 E77
- Length: 20.5 km (12.7 mi)

Major junctions
- North end: A 1 A 2 near Baltezers
- P 2 near Upesciems; P 4 near Ūlupji / Ulbroka; P 5 near Saurieši; A 6 near Saulkalne
- South end: Saulkalne / A 6

Location
- Country: Latvia

Highway system
- National Roads in Latvia
← A 3	→ A 5

The A4 is a main national road in Latvia. It is officially named Rīgas apvedceļš (Baltezers–Saulkalne) and forms the eastern section of the Riga bypass, connecting the A1 and A2 near Baltezers with the A6 near Saulkalne. The road has a total length of 20.5 km (12.7 mi), all of which is state-owned.

The A4 is part of Latvia's TEN-T road network. It carries European route E67 and European route E77, while its southern part also forms a connection between the E22 corridor from the P5 and P80 route and the A6 at Saulkalne. Together with the A5, the A4 forms the main road bypass around Riga.

== Route description ==
The A4 starts near Baltezers, at the junction with the A1 and A2. It runs south and south-east through the eastern part of the Riga metropolitan area, passing near Upesciems, Ūlupji, Ulbroka, Saurieši, Salaspils and Saulkalne, where it ends at the junction with the A6.

The road crosses the Lielā Jugla and Mazā Jugla rivers. Its main intermediate junctions are with the P2 near Upesciems, the P4 near Ūlupji and Ulbroka, and the P5 near Saurieši.

The P5 junction is important for traffic toward eastern Latvia. The P5 continues east through Tīnūži, where it connects with the P80 Tīnūži–Koknese road, a route built as part of the E22 corridor toward Koknese and eastern Latvia.

The A4 has one carriageway with one lane in each direction along its full length. The road is paved with asphalt concrete. Outside built-up areas, the ordinary maximum speed limit is generally 90 km/h (56 mph), unless otherwise signed. In 2026, Latvijas Valsts ceļi did not list any A4 section among the state-road sections with a seasonal 100 km/h (62 mph) or 110 km/h (68 mph) speed limit.

== History and reconstruction ==
Construction of the Riga bypass began in 1964 and was completed in 1980. The bypass consists of two main state-road sections: the A4, officially named Rīgas apvedceļš (Baltezers–Saulkalne), on the eastern side of Riga, and the A5, officially named Rīgas apvedceļš (Salaspils–Babīte), on the southern and western side of the city. The A4 was built as a single-carriageway bypass road intended to divert through traffic away from Riga's urban street network.

In 2011–2012, part of the A4 was rebuilt.

A larger reconstruction of the A4 had already been studied in the 2000s. In 2006, an environmental impact assessment procedure was started for reconstruction of the A4 from the A2 junction to approximately km 19.0. The assessed project envisaged converting the existing single-carriageway two-lane road into a dual-carriageway four-lane road, replacing eleven at-grade junctions with grade-separated crossings and building local access roads. The environmental impact assessment opinion for that project was issued in March 2007.

In 2017–2018, major reconstruction works were carried out on the A4 section from Avoti, between the P4 and P5 junctions, to the railway overpass near the A6, km 12.48–19.66. The works included reconstruction of the pavement structure with three new asphalt layers, renewal of the bridge over the Mazā Jugla down to its load-bearing structures, construction of a new bridge deck slab, renewal of waterproofing and pavement, drainage improvements and culvert replacement. The works were completed on 24 August 2018; the contract value was €6.16 million, including VAT, and 85% of the cost was co-financed by the European Union Cohesion Fund.

In 2020, warranty repairs were carried out on the bridge over the Mazā Jugla. LVC noted that the bridge had been rebuilt in 2018 together with the A4 reconstruction between km 12.48 and 19.66.

== Expressway reconstruction plans ==
Plans to widen the A4 have existed for many years. In 2018, Latvijas Valsts ceļi described the A4 project as the reconstruction of the existing 20 km (12 mi) route into a road with two carriageways and four lanes. The project also envisaged replacing at-grade junctions with grade-separated interchanges and building a parallel road for local traffic. At that stage, a sketch design had been prepared, the environmental impact assessment was being developed, and the project was considered for possible implementation using a public–private partnership model.

Earlier public information suggested that widening could begin around 2020, with the route later receiving an expressway or motorway-type status and a higher speed limit. That timetable was not implemented. A new environmental impact assessment procedure for rebuilding the existing two-lane A4 as an expressway was initiated by a decision of 10 November 2020.

The updated environmental impact assessment documentation was submitted in March 2024, and the environmental impact assessment opinion was issued on 17 May 2024. The assessed project covers the full 20.5 km (12.7 mi) A4 corridor and envisages reconstructing the existing two-lane road into an expressway with two carriageways, four traffic lanes and the NP26 normal profile. The proposed maximum permitted speed is up to 130 km/h (81 mph), except in locations where lower speeds are required because of physical constraints or traffic-safety considerations.

The expressway project also envisages grade-separated junctions with the main connecting roads and the organisation of local traffic on lower-category roads connected to the main route through interchanges. Existing direct accesses to the A4 would be removed or reorganised as part of the access-management scheme.

== Recent works ==
In 2025, works were carried out on the bridge over the Lielā Jugla near Upesciems, km 4.2. The works included construction of new expansion joints and renewal of the asphalt wearing course; LVC reported that traffic in both directions was planned to be restored by mid-August 2025, with full completion by September.

In May 2026, LVC reported that bridge-renewal works had started on the bridge over the Mazā Jugla on the A4 at km 14.10. The works included new expansion joints and renewal of the asphalt-concrete surface. The same contract also covered works on the A1 overpass near Ādaži; the contract value was €470,555, including VAT.

== Traffic and enforcement ==
Latvijas Valsts ceļi publishes traffic-intensity statistics for state roads as average vehicles per day. In the 2025 dataset, the unweighted average of the listed A4 section values was 12,940 vehicles per day.

Average-speed enforcement has been introduced on the A4. On 19 March 2026, two average-speed-control sections began operating: from the junction with the P4 to the bridge over the Mazā Jugla, km 10.1–13.9, and from the junction with the P5 to the overpass over the A6, km 14.5–19.9. The systems also check compulsory vehicle insurance, technical inspection status and road-user-charge compliance.

== Major intersections ==
Road	Location or connection
A 1 / A 2	near Baltezers; connection toward Tallinn, Saulkrasti, Riga and Sigulda
P 2	near Upesciems
P 4	near Ūlupji / Ulbroka; connection toward Riga and Ērgļi
P 5	near Saurieši; connection toward Ulbroka, Ogre and, via Tīnūži, the P80 route toward Koknese and eastern Latvia
A 6	Saulkalne; connection toward Riga, Ogre, Daugavpils and the southern Riga bypass

== Settlements on or near the route ==
- Baltezers
- Upesciems
- Ūlupji
- Ulbroka
- Saurieši
- Salaspils
- Saulkalne

== Gallery ==
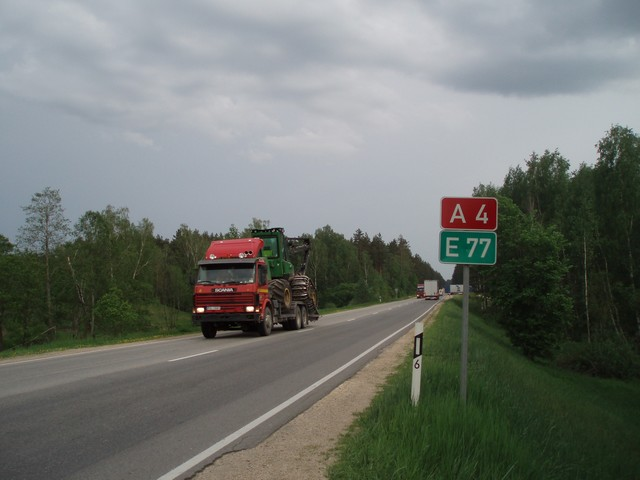
A4 in 2007.

== See also ==
- Transport in Latvia
- List of National Roads in Latvia
- Riga bypass
- A5 road (Latvia)
- European route E22
- European route E67
- European route E77
