= Pabaži Station =

Railway stop on the Zemitāni–Skulte Railway in Latvia

Pabaži
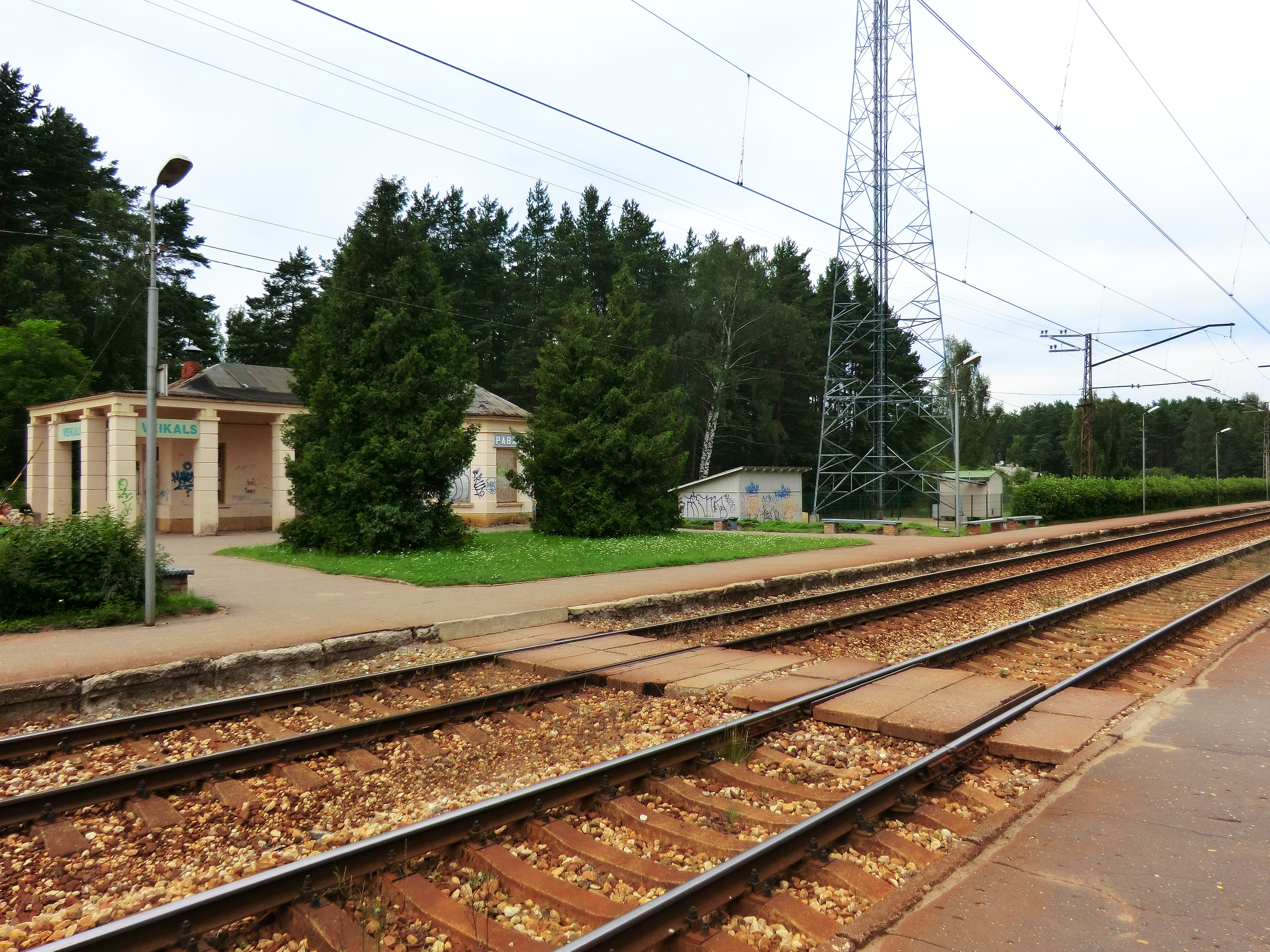

General information
- Location: Saulkrasti, Latvia
- Coordinates: 57°14′31.47″N 24°24′29.23″E
- Platforms: 2
- Tracks: 2

History
- Opened: 1934

Services
Preceding station	LDz	Following station
Inčupe towards Riga	Riga–Skulte Railway	Saulkrasti towards Skulte
Location

Pabaži Station is a railway station on the Zemitāni–Skulte Railway. Pabaži is located in the town of Saulkrasti, Saulkrasti Municipality, Latvia. The distance from Riga Passenger Station is 45 km, from Zemitāni Station 41 km, and to the terminus at Skulte Station 11 km. All trains to Saulkrasti, as well as trains to Skulte, stop at Pabaži.
