= Baltezers =

Baltezers ('White Lake') may refer to the following places in Latvia:

- Lakes
  - Lielais Baltezers (Large Baltezers) and Mazais Baltezers (Small Baltezers) near Riga, in the municipalities of Ropaži and Ādaži
- Villages
  - Baltezers, Ādaži Municipality
  - Baltezers, Ropaži Municipality
- Baltezers Station, on the Riga–Lugaži Railway
