= Inčupe Station =

Railway station in Latvia

Inčupe
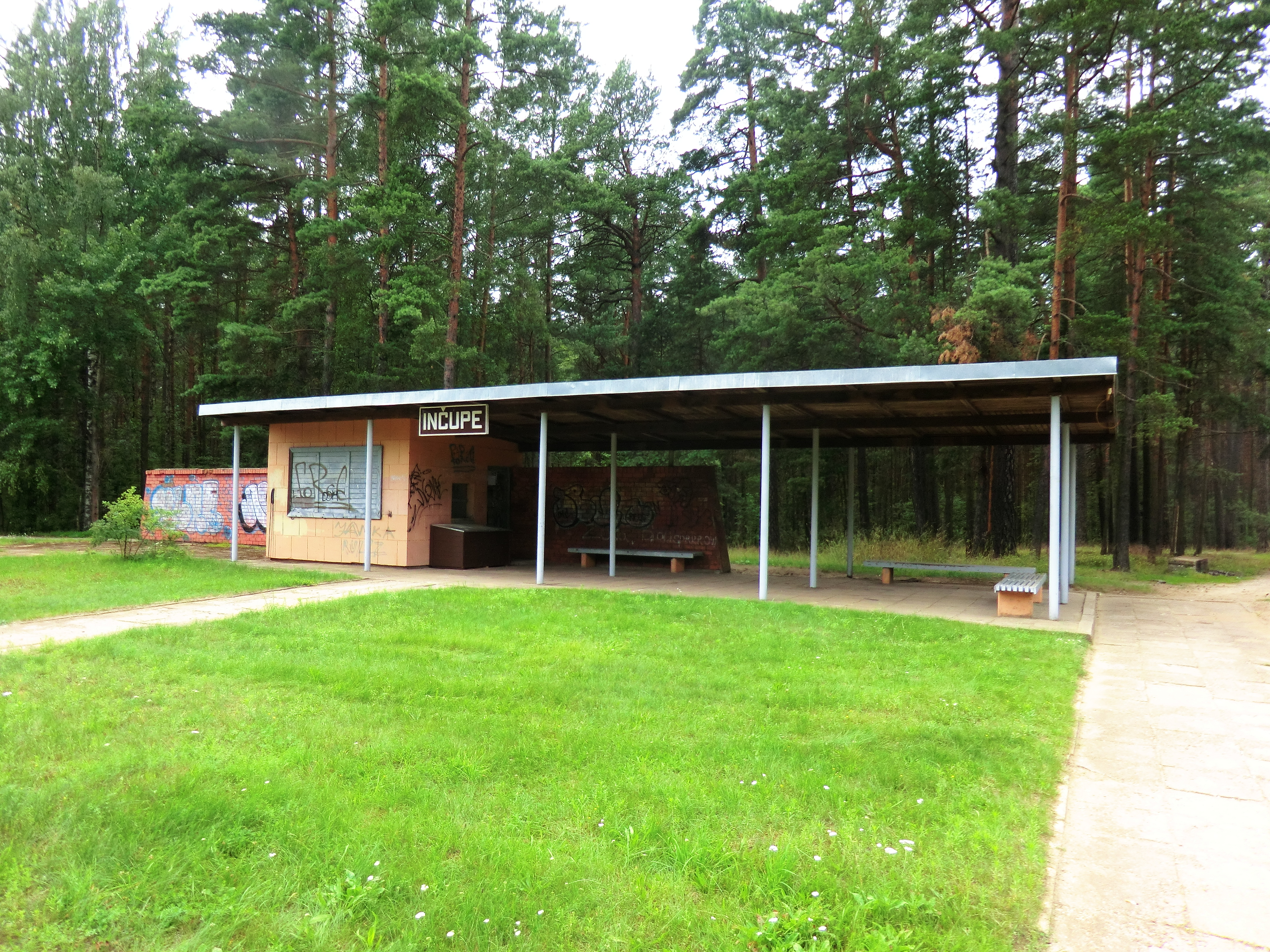

General information
- Location: Saulkrasti, Saulkrasti Municipality.
- Coordinates: 57°13′29.98″N 24°23′54.92″E
- Platforms: 2
- Tracks: 2

History
- Opened: 1971

Services
Preceding station	LDz	Following station
Lilaste towards Riga	Riga–Skulte Railway	Pabaži towards Skulte
Location

Inčupe Station is a railway station on the Zemitāni–Skulte Railway. It was planned to close Inčupe station in 2022, however service was reduced instead.
