= Ķīšupe Station =

Railway stop on the Zemitāni–Skulte Railway in Latvia

Ķīšupe
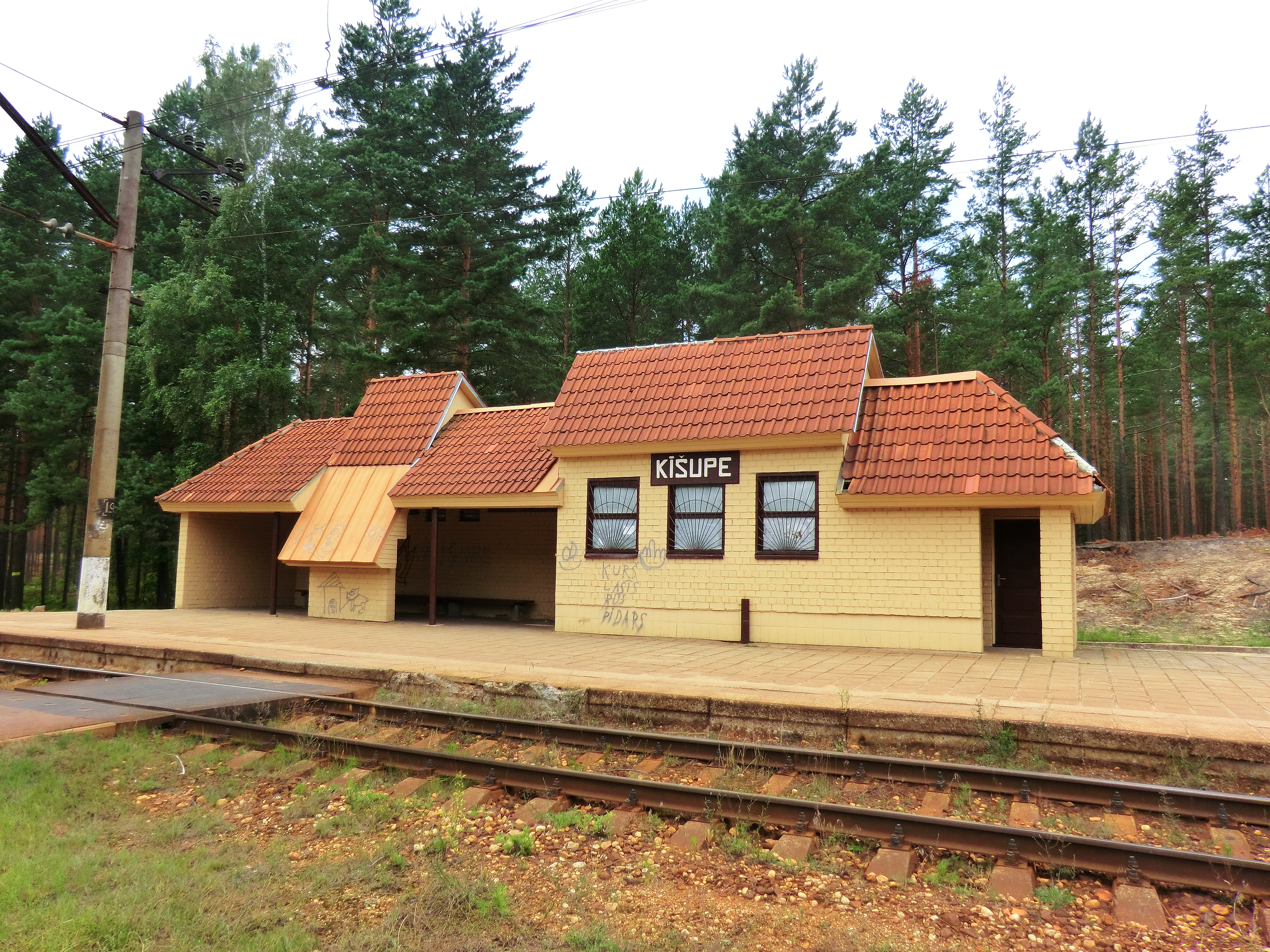

General information
- Location: Saulkrasti, Saulkrasti Municipality
- Coordinates: 57°17′10.6″N 24°25′58.0″E
- Platforms: 1
- Tracks: 1

History
- Opened: 1973

Services
Preceding station	LDz	Following station
Saulkrasti towards Riga	Riga–Skulte Railway	Zvejniekciems towards Skulte
Location

Ķīšupe Station is a Latvian railway station on the Zemitāni – Skulte Railway.
