= Gastrotheca lojana =

Conservation status
- Vulnerable (IUCN 3.1)

Scientific classification
- Kingdom: Animalia
- Phylum: Chordata
- Class: Amphibia
- Order: Anura
- Family: Hemiphractidae
- Genus: Gastrotheca
- Species: G. lojana

Binomial name
- Gastrotheca lojana Parker, 1932

Synonyms
- Gastrotheca marsupiata lojana Parker, 1932; Gastrotheca (Duellmania) lojana Dubois, 1987 "1986"

Species of frog

Gastrotheca lojana, the Lojana marsupial frog, is a species of frog in the family Hemiphractidae. It is endemic to Brazil.

== Description ==
The adult male frog measures 40.2–61.0 mm long in snout-vent length and the adult female frog 54.1–76.1 mm. The skin of the dorsum is light yellow, brown, or green in color with a beige or bronze line down the side of the body, with or without yellow-green marks. The flanks are dark brown or light-brown-bronze in color with or without some dark blue-gray. Some frogs have more blue-gray color than other frogs do. The belly is dark brown and white in color. The iris of the eye is bronze in color.

== Etymology ==
Scientists named this frog for the type locality, the province Loja.

== Habitat ==
This frog lives in cloud forest and shrubland. People see them on agave plants and under rocks during the day and on other plants at night. Scientists have seen the frog between 1,700 and 3,020 m (5,580 and 9,910 ft) above sea level.

== Reproduction ==
The female frog carries her eggs in a pouch on her back. She brings the tadpoles to small pools of water and in streams with still places.

== Threats ==
Scientists from the IUCN say the frog is vulnerable to extinction. Principal threats include water pollution and habitat loss in favor of urbanization, silviculture, and livestock cultivation. Scientists also detected Batrachocytrium dendrobatidis on the frog, but they do not believe chytridiomycosis is responsible for its major population declines. Cats and chickens can also kill some frogs.

== Formal descriptions ==
- Parker, H. W. (1932). "Some new or rare reptiles and amphibians from southern Ecuador". Annals and Magazine of Natural History. Series 10 (9): 21–26.
- Duellman WE; AJ Barley; PJ Venegas (2014). "Cryptic species diversity in marsupial frogs (Anura: Hemiphractidae: Gastrotheca) in the Andes of northern Peru". Zootaxa. 3768: 159–177.
