= Juris Bone =

Latvian diplomat (born 1969)

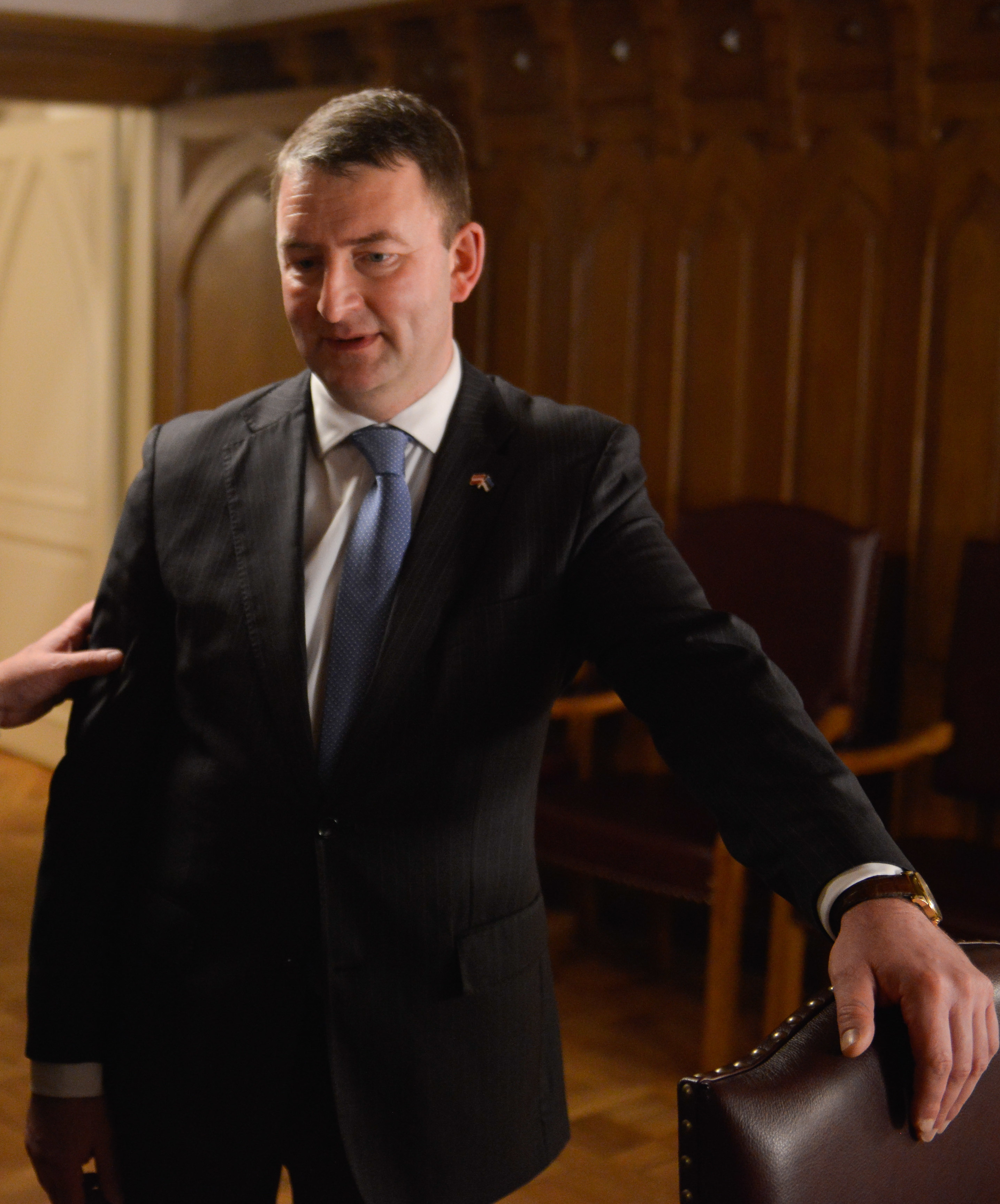

Latvia Ambassador to Finland
- In office 2009–2013

Latvia Ambassador to Estonia
- In office 2013–2017

Personal details
- Born: 10 May 1969 (age 57) Saulkrasti, Latvia
- Education: Riga Technical University; University of Latvia
- Occupation: diplomat

Juris Bone (born May 10, 1969 in Saulkrasti, Latvia) is a Latvian diplomat who served as Ambassador of the Republic of Latvia to the Finland from 2009 until 2013. Between 2013 and 2017 he served as Ambassador of the Republic of Latvia to Estonia.

== Biography ==
From 1987 to 1989 he studied at the Riga Polytechnic Institute at the Faculty of Engineering.

Between 1994 and 1996 he studied international relations at the University of Latvia and obtained a master's degree. Since 1995 he has been working in the Ministry of Foreign Affairs of Latvia.

From 1997 to 2000 he held the position of Second Secretary at the Latvian Embassy in Great Britain.

From 2000 to 2004, he again worked in the Ministry in the public relations office and the American department.

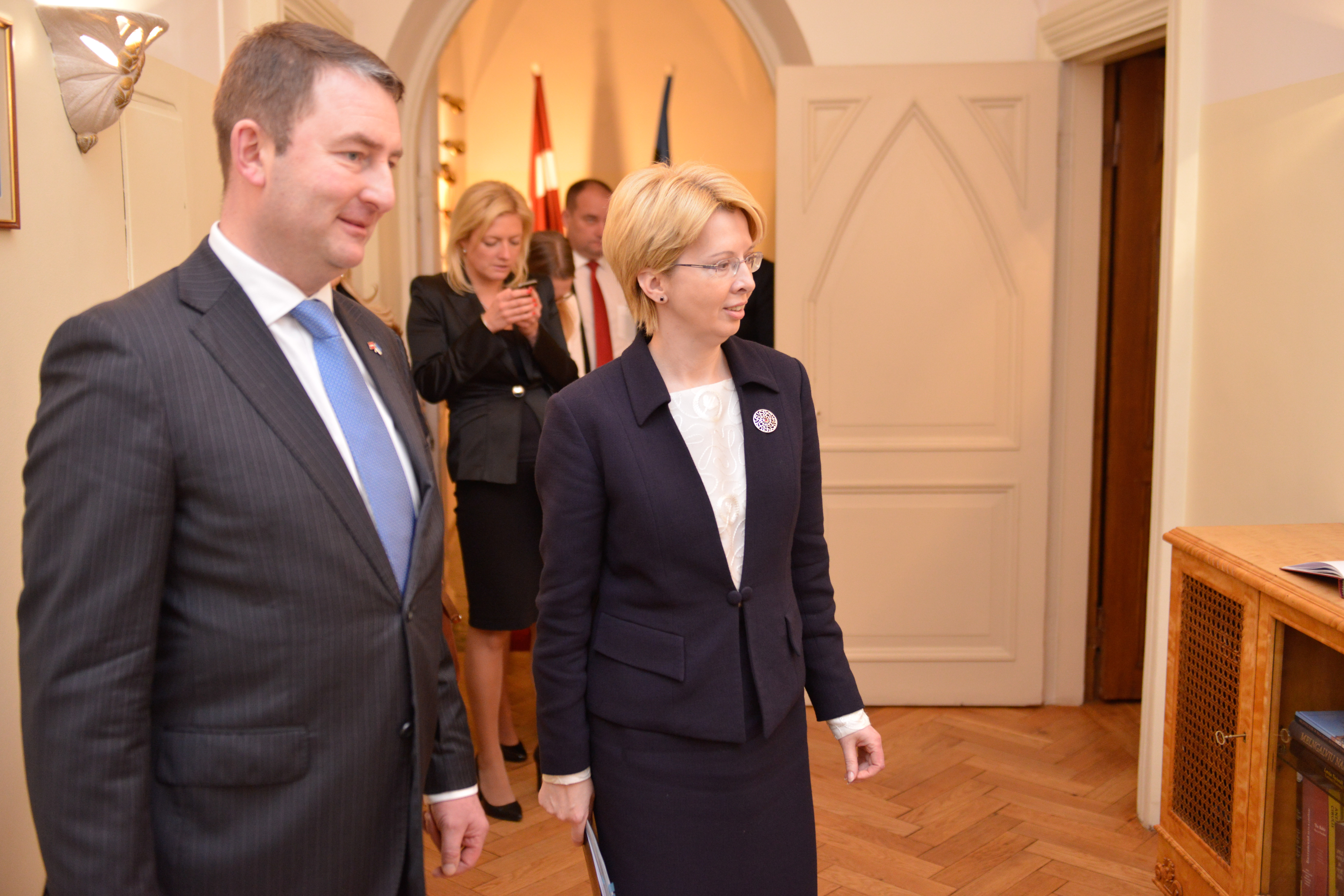
Juris Bone and the Speaker of the Latvian Parliament, Ināra Mūrniece, during a meeting with representatives of the Latvian Diaspora in Estonia, 2014

From 2004 to 2007 he was the Deputy Head of the Latvian Mission in Estonia, and from 2007 to 2009 - the Head of the State Protocol of the Ministry of Foreign Affairs of Latvia.

Between 2013 and 2017 he was the Ambassador of the Republic of Latvia to Estonia. Since then, he has held the position of ambassador on special assignments.

== Awards ==
- 2008: Grand Cross pro Merito Melitensi
- 2009: Third Class of the Order of Merit of Ukraine
- 2009: Order of the Cross of Terra Mariana, 3rd Class
- 2013: Order of the White Rose of Finland
- 2017: Order of the Cross of Terra Mariana, 1st Class
