= Loja =

Loja may refer to:

== Places ==
- Loja, Granada, Spain
- Loja, Ecuador
- Loja, Estonia
- Loja, Latvia
- Loja Canton, Ecuador
- Loja Province, Ecuador

== Other ==
- Loja (architecture), a type of store in Cape Verde
- Loja (crater), a Martian crater
- Loja (katydid), a genus of bush cricket in the tribe Agraeciini
- Loja Airport, Ecuador
- Loja, a novel by Albanian writer Teodor Keko
- Loja CD, a football team from the Spanish town
- LDU Loja, a football team from the Ecuadorian city
- António Loja (1933 or 1934–2024), Portuguese politician and teacher
- Mário Loja (born 1977), Portuguese football player

== See also ==
- Nueva Loja, a city in Ecuador
- Loxa, a genus of insects
- Loja bark or Loxa bark, another name for cinchona
