= A1 road (Latvia) =

Road in Latvia

Coordinates: 57.441502°N 24.429575°E

A1
- Tallinas šoseja

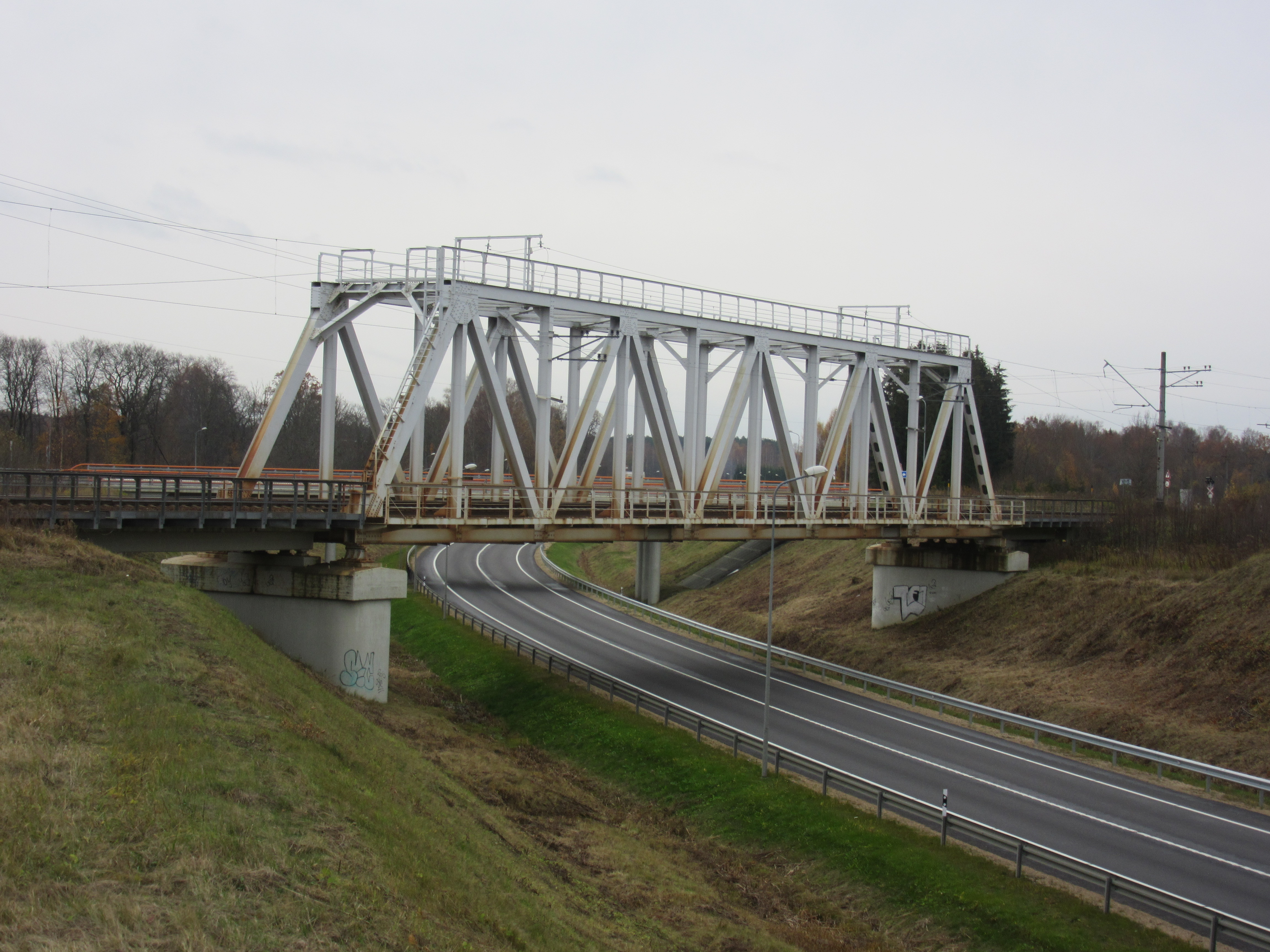
- The A1 near Skulte

Route information
- Part of E67
- Length: 101.7 km (63.2 mi)

Major junctions
- South end: A 2 A 4 near Baltezers
- P 1 near Ādaži; P 6 near Saulkrasti; P 53 near Dunte; P 11 near Tūja; P 12 near Salacgrīva; P 15 near Ainaži
- North end: Estonia border at Ainaži; E67 / T4

Location
- Country: Latvia

Highway system
- National Roads in Latvia
← A 15	→ A 2

The A1 is a main national road in Latvia. It is officially named Rīga (Baltezers)–Igaunijas robeža (Ainaži) and connects the Riga bypass near Baltezers with the Estonian border at Ainaži. The road is commonly known as the Tallinn Highway (Tallinas šoseja). It has a total length of 101.7 km (63.2 mi), of which 99.4 km (61.8 mi) are state-owned and 2.3 km (1.4 mi) are municipal-owned road sections.

The A1 forms the northern Latvian section of European route E67 and Via Baltica. It is part of Latvia's TEN-T road network; in Latvia the TEN-T core network includes the north–south Ainaži–Riga–Grenctāle corridor. At the Estonian border, the road continues as European route E67 and Estonian national road 4 toward Pärnu and Tallinn.

== Route description ==
The A1 starts at the junction with the A2 and A4 near Baltezers, north-east of Riga. From there it runs north through Ādaži Municipality, passing Ādaži, crossing the Gauja and continuing toward Lilaste. North of Lilaste, the road follows the coastal part of Vidzeme and generally remains within several kilometres of the Gulf of Riga.

The road bypasses Saulkrasti and Zvejniekciems on the inland side before continuing north through or near Skulte, Dunte, Tūja, Svētciems, Salacgrīva, Kuiviži and Ainaži. According to the official route list, the municipal section of the A1 in Salacgrīva follows Vidzemes iela, Viļņu iela and Pērnavas iela.

Most of the A1 is a single-carriageway road with one lane in each direction. The Saulkrasti bypass has a higher-standard alignment with grade-separated junctions and separated local access roads in several places. The route is paved with asphalt concrete along its full length.

Outside built-up areas, the ordinary maximum speed limit is generally 90 km/h (56 mph), unless otherwise signed. In 2026, Latvijas Valsts ceļi did not list any A1 section among the state-road sections with a seasonal 100 km/h (62 mph) or 110 km/h (68 mph) speed limit.

== History and reconstruction ==
=== Early Via Baltica upgrades north of Riga ===
In the early 2000s, several A1 sections north of Riga were reconstructed as part of the wider Via Baltica improvement programme. The reconstructed Baltezers–Ādaži section was widened to an 11.5 m (38 ft) carriageway, and to about 12 m (39 ft) in the built-up area of Baltezers. The works included lighting, storm-water drainage, pedestrian sidewalks, a cycling route, safety barriers, local access streets, a road overpass across the Riga–Sigulda railway, a pedestrian bridge at Berģi and pedestrian tunnels in Baltezers.

The Ādaži–Gauja section, km 6.3–12.6, was also reconstructed and widened to an 11.5 m (38 ft) asphalt carriageway with 1.75 m (5.7 ft) unpaved shoulders. The project included reconstruction of minor junctions, construction of parallel local roads, an overpass at Draudzības iela, reduction of left-turn movements, new signs and road markings. The works were financed from the Latvian state budget and the European Union Cohesion Fund, with reported construction costs of €11.3 million.

The Gauja–Lilaste section, km 12.8–21.0, and the bridge over the Lilaste Canal were reconstructed as an ISPA-funded Via Baltica project. The carriageway was widened from 8.5 m (28 ft) to 11.5 m (38 ft), intersections and parking areas were rebuilt, lighting was installed at two junctions, the old bridge over the Lilaste Canal was rebuilt, and a pedestrian tunnel was built north of the Gauja bridge to remove a dangerous at-grade pedestrian crossing.

=== Saulkrasti bypass ===
The largest single development on the A1 after the restoration of Latvian independence was the construction of the Saulkrasti bypass. The project was intended to remove long-distance and transit traffic from Saulkrasti, which had been one of the main Latvian bottlenecks on the Via Baltica corridor.

The bypass was built between 2005 and 2007 and opened to traffic in September 2007. The project created a 20.4 km (12.7 mi), 11 m (36 ft) wide two-lane road from Lilaste to Skulte, diverting through traffic away from Saulkrasti and reducing congestion and noise in the resort town.

The wider Saulkrasti bypass project also included rehabilitation of about 14.8 km (9.2 mi) of the former A1 corridor through Saulkrasti. The project included bridges and overpasses, railway crossings, pedestrian and cycling facilities, lighting, noise barriers, fencing and bus stops. The European Union co-financed 36% of the project cost, and the EU investment was reported as €40.03 million.

=== Later works ===
During the 2014–2020 Cohesion Fund planning period, the A1 section from Salacgrīva to the Estonian border, km 89.40–101.36, was reconstructed together with the bridge over the Krišupe. The project covered 11.96 km (7.43 mi) of road. Works started on 11 May 2015, were completed on 4 August 2016 and the reconstructed section was put into operation on 27 September 2016. The eligible project cost was €11.48 million, including €9.76 million from the Cohesion Fund.

In 2018, the pavement surface was renewed on the A1 section from Dunte to Svētciems, km 48.10–81.28. The works included asphalt levelling milling, construction of a hot-asphalt wearing course, culvert cleaning, shoulder renewal, acoustic rumble strips and renewal of horizontal road markings. The contract value was €5.3 million, including VAT, and the works were financed from the Latvian state budget.

In 2020, resurfacing works were carried out on the Saulkrasti bypass from Lilaste to Zvejniekciems, km 21.030–36.297. The works included asphalt levelling milling and a new asphalt surface course. They were carried out by SIA Via for €2.2 million, including VAT, financed from the Latvian state budget.

== Salaca bridge replacement ==
A major bottleneck on the A1 was the bridge over the Salaca in Salacgrīva. In 2024, a contract was signed for construction of a new bridge on the A1 at km 91.10. The old bridge was demolished and replaced with a new four-span steel and reinforced-concrete girder bridge, with new supports, steel beams and pedestrian infrastructure. The contract price was €14.97 million, excluding VAT.

The new Salaca bridge was opened to traffic on 12 November 2025. After opening, traffic could use both lanes without traffic-light control, and heavy vehicles and military vehicles were allowed to cross without restrictions.

== Current and planned works ==
In June 2026, construction began on a pedestrian and cycling tunnel under the A1 near Medzābaki, km 20.11–20.15. During the works, road traffic is diverted via a temporary bypass. The project includes a tunnel connecting sidewalks at the bus stop, lighting, drainage, safety fencing and accessibility features. The contract value is €700,370.84, including VAT.

In 2022, Latvijas Valsts ceļi announced design procurement for a two-level crossing of the A1 in Ādaži, near Baltezers–Ādaži road V30/Rīgas gatve and Muižas iela. The project was intended to improve traffic safety and provide a safer connection across the A1 for vehicles, pedestrians and cyclists. Construction was described as possible no earlier than 2024, depending on available financing.

Latvijas Valsts ceļi's 2025 design-procurement plan listed further development of the A1 corridor between km 0.0 and 40.4 according to TEN-T requirements, including investigation work for km 0.0–6.0 and preliminary design with environmental impact assessment for km 6.0–40.4. The same plan also listed a separate investigation project for safety and traffic-flow improvements on the A1 between km 0.0 and 6.8, from the A1/A2/A4 overpass to the Draudzības iela overpass.

A separate proposal for a new high-speed E67/A1 section between Vangaži and Skulte was studied from 2021. It was intended to divert transit traffic away from Baltezers and Ādaži and was considered in connection with the future Rail Baltica corridor. However, the environmental impact assessment record later stated that further progress on the project had been discontinued, so the Vangaži–Skulte expressway is treated as a discontinued proposal rather than an active construction project.

== Traffic and enforcement ==
Latvijas Valsts ceļi publishes traffic-intensity statistics for state roads as the average number of vehicles per day. Traffic volumes on the A1 are highest on the southern approach near the Riga bypass and Ādaži and decrease north of Saulkrasti toward the Estonian border. In the 2025 dataset, the listed A1 section values ranged from 4,823 vehicles per day near the Estonian border to 28,264 vehicles per day on the first section from the Riga bypass.

Average-speed enforcement has been introduced on several A1 sections. On 8 September 2023, an average-speed-control section began operating between Siguļi and Lilaste, km 14.1–20.1. On 25 February 2026, another section began operating between Vitrupe and Svētciems, km 74.6–81.1. The systems also check compulsory vehicle insurance, technical inspection status and road-user-charge compliance.

== Major intersections ==
Road	Location or connection
A 2 / A 4	Start of the A1 near Baltezers
P 1	near Ādaži; connection toward Carnikava
P 6	near Saulkrasti; connection toward Sēja and Ragana
P 53	near Dunte; connection toward Limbaži
P 11	near Tūja; connection toward Limbaži
P 12	Salacgrīva; connection toward Limbaži
P 15	near Ainaži; connection toward Matīši
E67 / T4	Estonian border; continuation toward Pärnu and Tallinn

== Settlements on or near the route ==
- Riga area
- Baltezers
- Ādaži
- Lilaste
- Saulkrasti
- Zvejniekciems
- Skulte
- Dunte
- Tūja
- Jelgavkrasti
- Svētciems
- Salacgrīva
- Kuiviži
- Ainaži

== Gallery ==
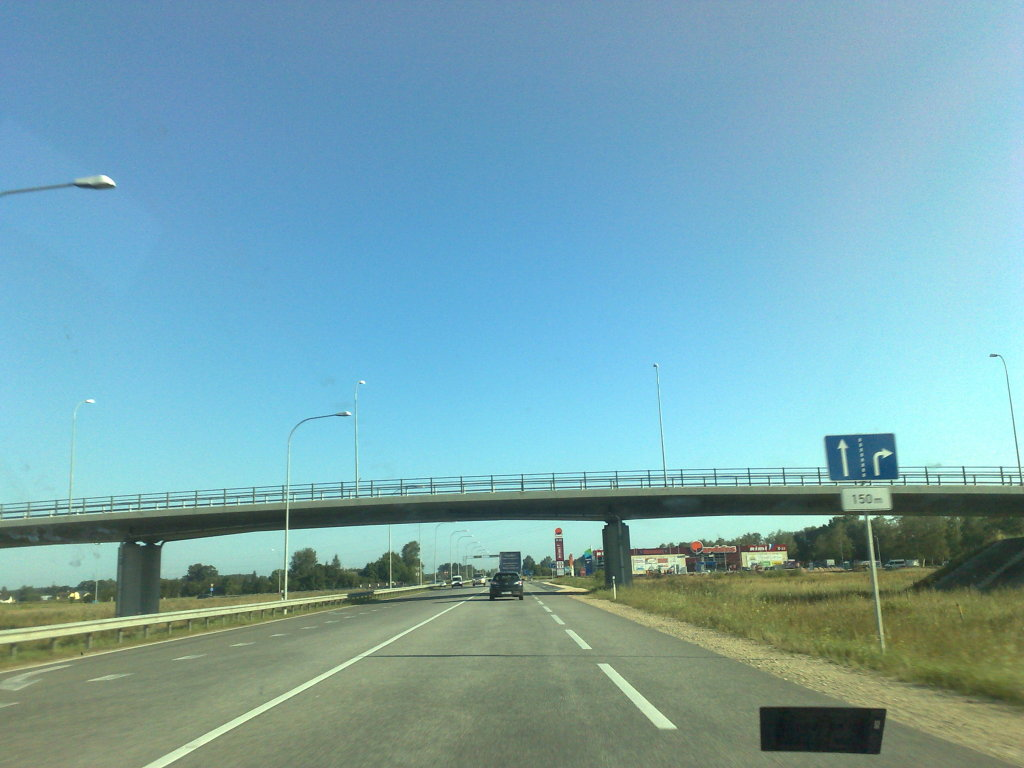
A1 near Ādaži.

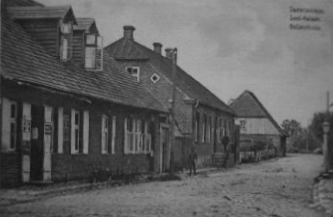
Road crossing in Salacgrīva in 1910.

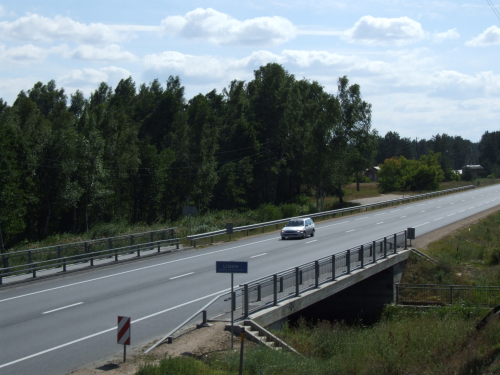
A1 crossing the Lilaste.

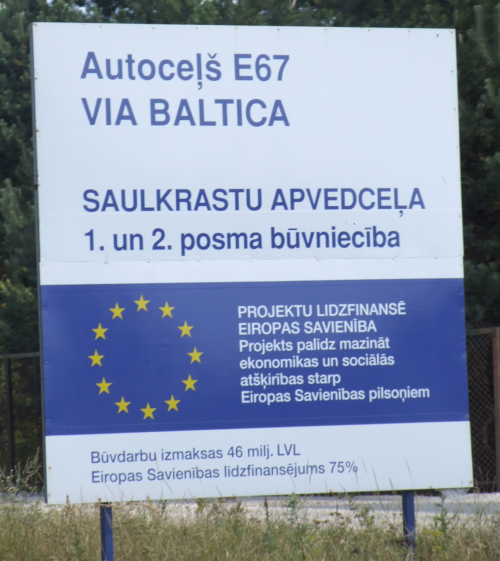
Sign showing construction of the Saulkrasti bypass in 2006.

== See also ==
- Transport in Latvia
- List of national roads in Latvia
- European route E67
- Via Baltica
