= Saulkrasti Jazz Festival =

Jazz festival held in Latvia

- Genre: Jazz
- Locations: Saulkrasti, Latvia
- Coordinates: 57°29′12″N 24°41′42″E
- Years active: 1997–present

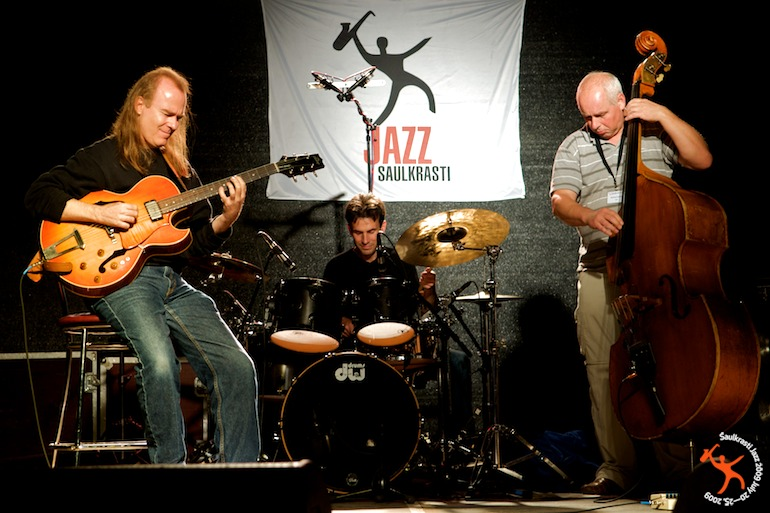
Guitarist David Becker, who has participated several times

Saulkrasti Jazz Festival is a jazz festival in Latvia. It is held annually in July in Saulkrasti. The weeklong festival consists of concerts and educational camps for young musicians.

== Competitions ==
Baltic Drummers' League is an international competition for young drummers at the Saulkrasti Jazz Festival. It is organized with Riga Dome Choir School and Paiste. Competitors are divided in two groups: Juniors of 14- to 17-year-olds and the Seniors of 18- to 25-year-olds. Finals are judged by an international panel of judges. The program may not exceed 15 minutes. International panel of judges: Eric Moore (US), Aleksandr Murenko (Ukraine), Venko Poromanski (Bulgaria), Zaza Tsertsvadze (Georgia). Program:

- Solo small drums (up to 3 minutes)
- Solo percussion set (up to 4 minutes)
- Playing on a phonogram or with an ensemble (up to 5 minutes)
- Seniors only: Open solo (up to 3 minutes)
