= Lilaste, Ādaži Municipality =

Lilaste
- Village
- Location within Latvia
- Coordinates: 57°11′13″N 24°20′15″E
- Country: Latvia
- Municipality: Ādaži Municipality
- Parish: Carnikava Parish

Area
  - Total: 0.41 km^{2} (0.16 sq mi)
- Elevation: 3 m (9.8 ft)

Population (2015)
  - Total: 164
- Time zone: UTC+2 (EET)
  - Summer (DST): UTC+3 (EEST)
- Postal code: LV-2163 Carnikava

Lilaste is a village in Carnikava Parish of Ādaži Municipality in the Vidzeme region of Latvia. Located in the north of the parish on the left bank of the Lilaste river between Lake Lilaste and the coast of the Gulf of Riga, north of the Zemitāni–Skulte Railway (Lilaste Station) and the A1 road, 13 km (8.1 mi) from the parish centre Carnikava, 16.5 km (10.3 mi) from the municipal centre Ādaži and 35 km (22 mi) from the centre of Riga. On the other side of the Lilaste river is the village of Saulkrasti.

In the territory of Lilaste there are two apartment buildings, individual buildings, backyard farms. In the village, there are buildings built for the training base of the anti-aircraft troops of the former Soviet Army, which are gradually being rebuilt. Hotel "Medzābaki" (on the shore of the lake) and a woodworking company are located in Lilaste.

Near the railway station is the up to 28 metres (according to another source - 20.2 metres) high Lilaste parabolic dune, which was once located on the seashore, but was gradually blown by the wind to the railway. Since the 1930s, the dune has been forested and stopped moving.
