= Lilaste Station =

Railway station on the Zemitāni–Skulte Railway in Latvia

Lilaste
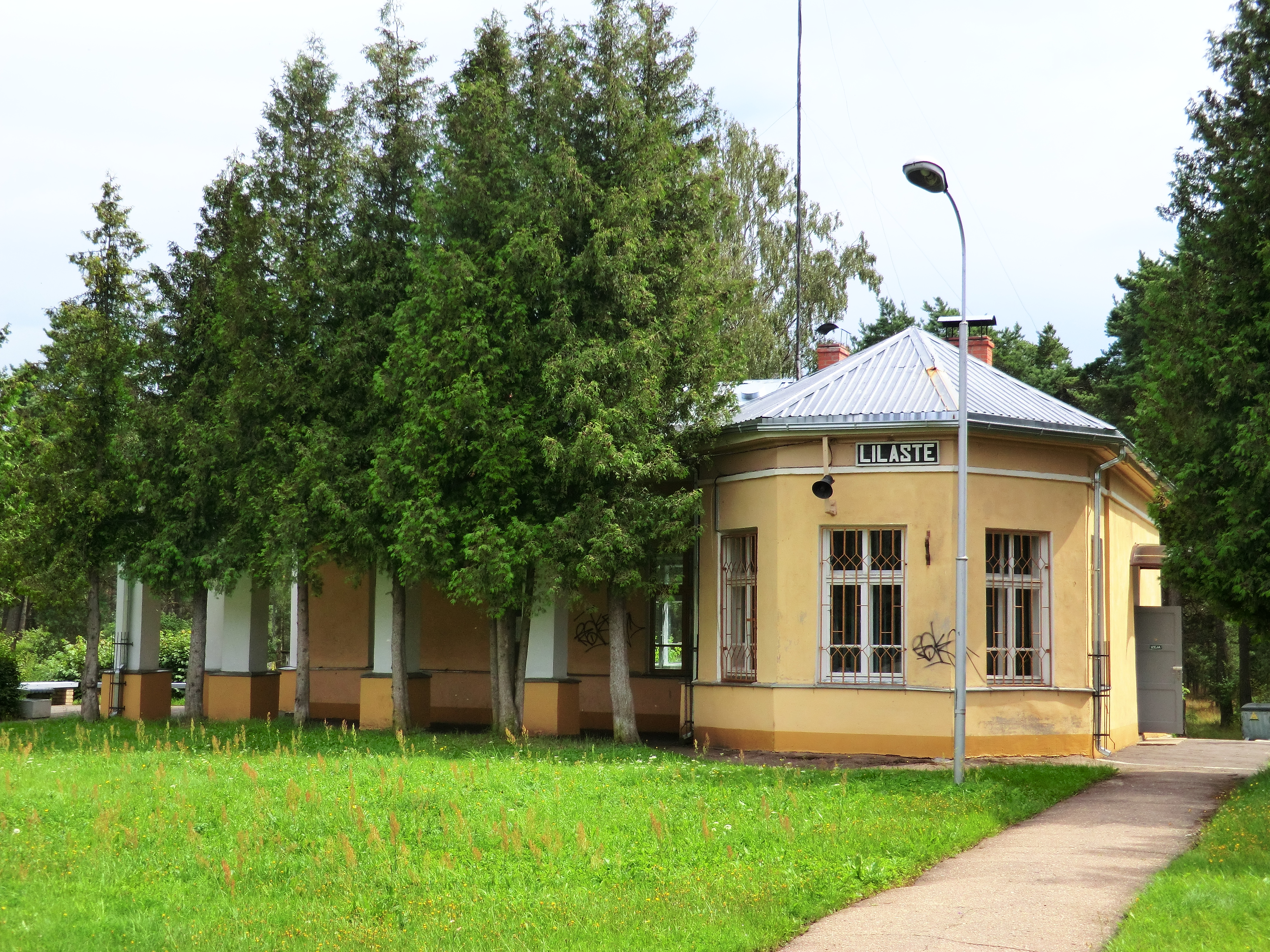
- Lilaste station building

General information
- Location: Lilaste, Carnikava Parish, Ādaži Municipality
- Coordinates: 57°10′55.25″N 24°20′14.32″E
- Platforms: 2
- Tracks: 3

History
- Opened: 1934
- Former names: Līlaste

Services
Preceding station	LDz	Following station
Gauja towards Riga	Riga–Skulte Railway	Inčupe towards Skulte
Location

Lilaste Station is a railway station on the Zemitāni–Skulte Railway in Latvia. It is located on the outskirts of the village of Lilaste in Carnikava Parish, Ādaži Municipality, 37.2 kilometres (23.1 mi) from Zemitāni. It has a double-track line to Carnikava and a single-track line to Saulkrasti.
