= Saulkrasti Parish =

Parish of Latvia

- parish of Latvia
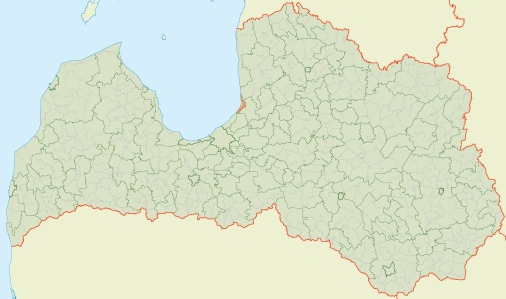
- 57°15′04″N 24°25′16″E
- Country: Latvia

Area
  - Total: 41.59 km^{2} (16.06 sq mi)
  - Land: 40.9 km^{2} (15.8 sq mi)
  - Water: 0.69 km^{2} (0.27 sq mi)

Population (1 January 2024)
  - Total: 4,486
  - Density: 110/km^{2} (280/sq mi)

Saulkrasti Parish (Latvian: Saulkrastu pagasts) is an administrative unit of the Saulkrasti Municipality, Latvia. It was created in 2010 from the countryside territory of Saulkrasti town. At the beginning of 2014, the population of the parish was 2890.

== Towns, villages and settlements of Saulkrasti parish ==
- Lilaste
- Zvejniekciems
