= Zvejniekciems Station =

Railway stop on the Zemitāni–Skulte Railway in Latvia

Zvejniekciems
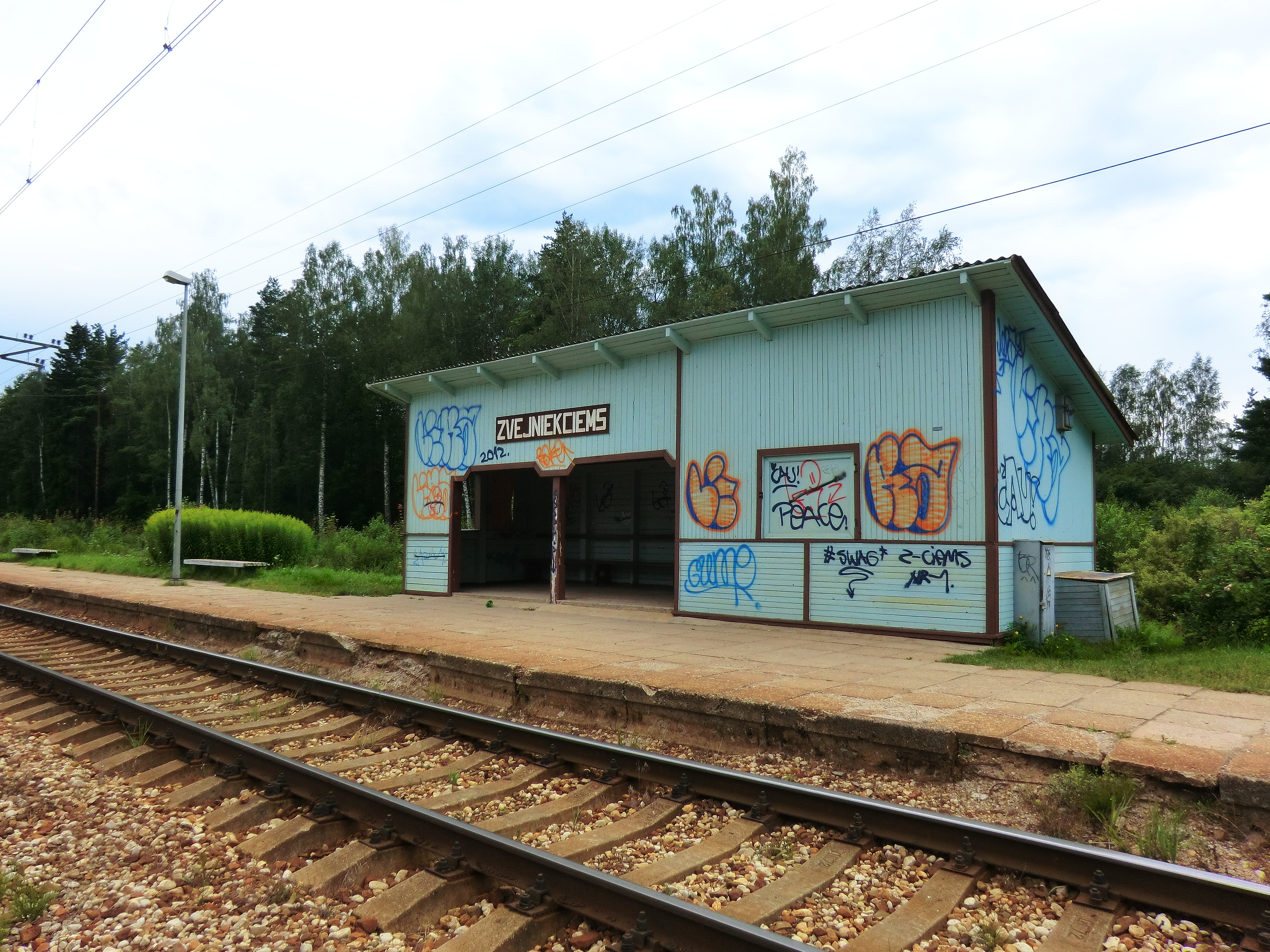

General information
- Location: Skulte Parish, Limbaži Municipality
- Coordinates: 57°18′25″N 24°26′33″E
- Platforms: 1
- Tracks: 1

History
- Opened: 1934

Services
Preceding station	LDz	Following station
Ķīšupe towards Riga	Riga–Skulte Railway	Skulte Terminus
Location

Zvejniekciems Station is a railway station on the Zemitāni–Skulte Railway. The station opened in 1934 to serve the village of Zvejniekciems. It began serving electrified trains as a terminus in 1971. In 1991, with the extension of electrification to Skulte, the terminus station was transformed into a waypoint.
