= Gauja Station =

Railway station in Latvia

Gauja
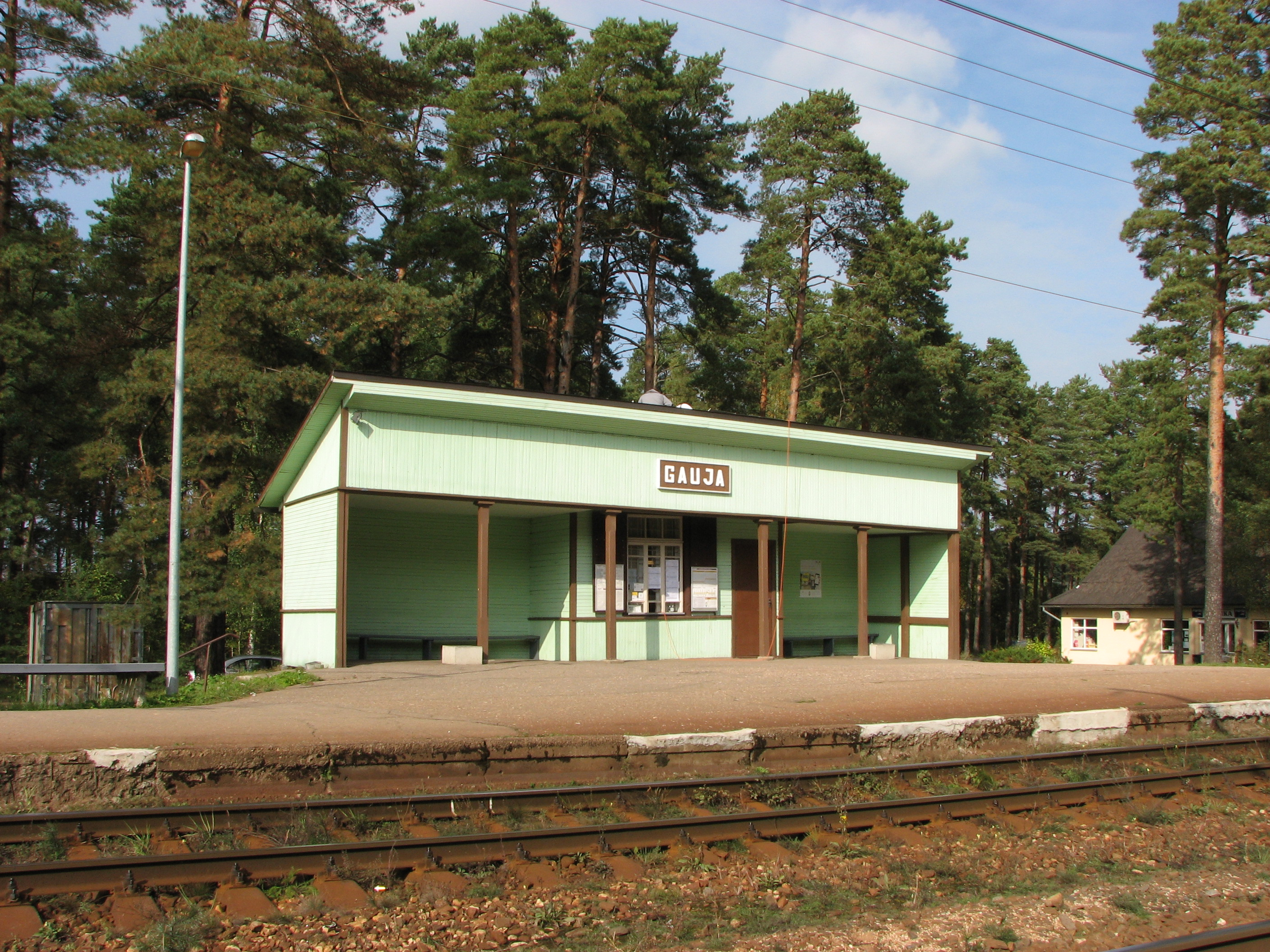
- Gauja station in 2016

General information
- Coordinates: 57°8′29.50″N 24°17′17.39″E
- Platforms: 2
- Tracks: 2

History
- Opened: 1934

Services
Preceding station	LDz	Following station
Carnikava towards Riga	Riga–Skulte Railway	Lilaste towards Skulte
Location

Gauja Station is a railway station on the Zemitāni–Skulte Railway.
