= Sēja Municipality =

Municipality of Latvia

Coordinates: 57°09′10″N 24°38′40″E

Sēja Municipality Sējas novads
- Municipality
- Flag Coat of arms

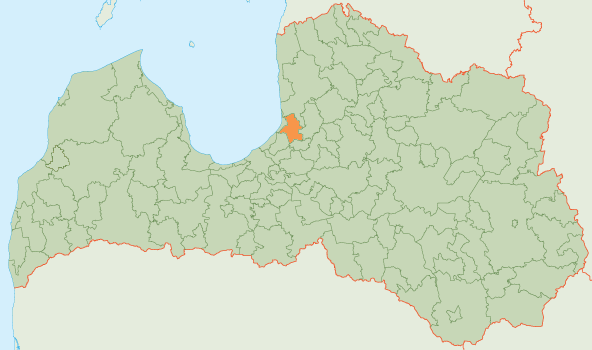
- Country: Latvia
- Formed: 2006
- Centre: Loja

Government
  - Council Chair: Guntis Liepiņš (Fatherland/LRA)

Area
  - Total: 230.12 km^{2} (88.85 sq mi)
  - Land: 225.56 km^{2} (87.09 sq mi)
  - Water: 4.56 km^{2} (1.76 sq mi)

Population (2021)
  - Total: 2,151
  - Density: 9.536/km^{2} (24.70/sq mi)
- Website: www.seja.lv

Sēja Municipality (Latvian: Sējas novads) was a former municipality in Vidzeme, Latvia. The municipality was formed in 2006 by reorganization of Sēja Parish; the administrative centre being Loja. The population in 2020 was 2,156.

On 1 July 2021, Sēja Municipality ceased to exist and its territory was merged into Saulkrasti Municipality as Sēja Parish.

== See also ==
- Administrative divisions of Latvia (2009)
