= Carnikava Station =

Railway station in Ādaži Municipality, Latvia

Carnikava
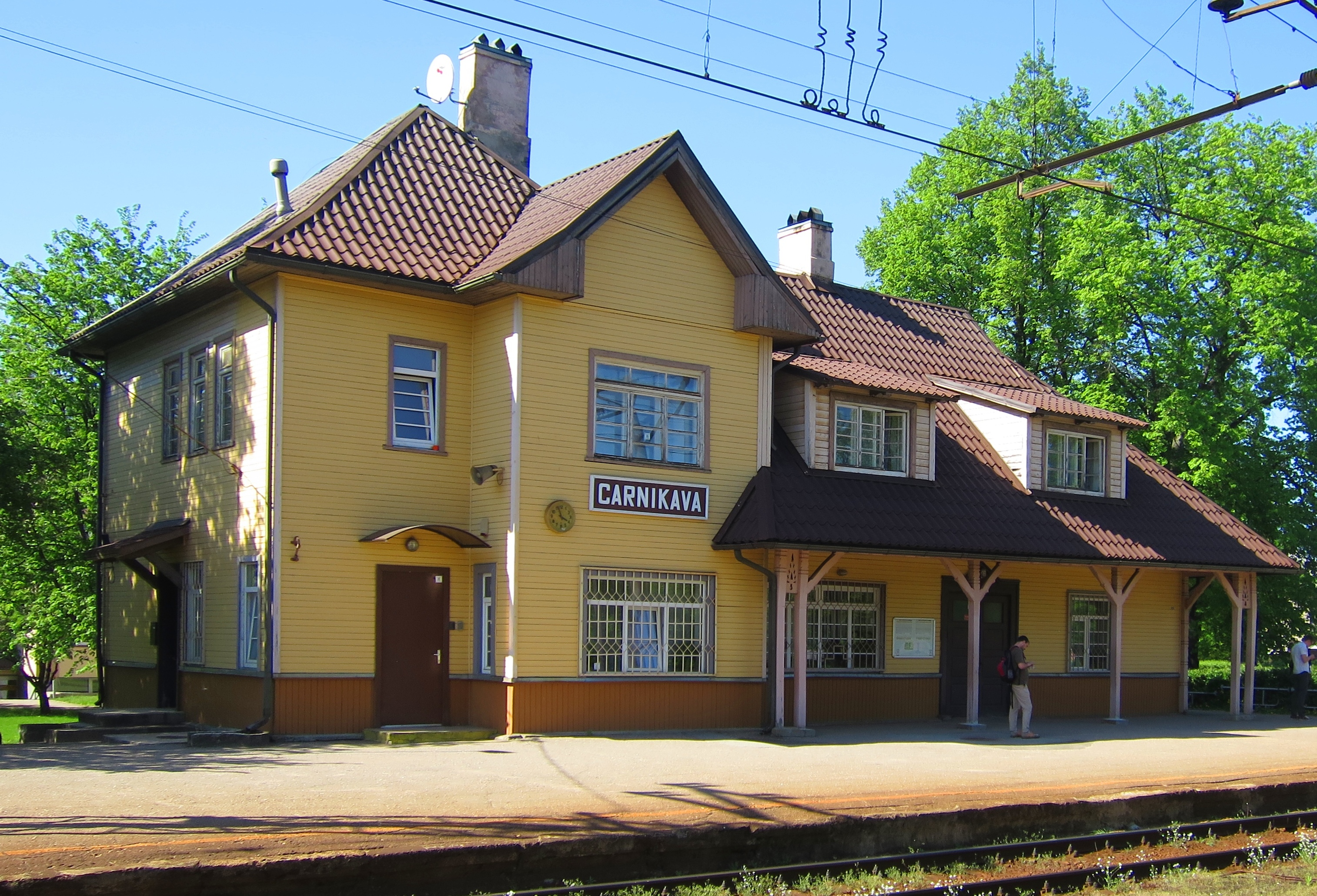
- Carnikava Station in 2018

General information
- Location: Stacijas iela 5, Carnikava; Carnikava Parish, Ādaži Municipality; Latvia
- Coordinates: 57°7′41.88″N 24°16′45.21″E
- Owner: Latvijas dzelzceļš
- Line: Zemitāni–Skulte Railway
- Platforms: 2 side platforms
- Tracks: 2
- Train operators: Vivi

Construction
- Architect: Jānis Blaus

History
- Opened: 1933 (building 1934/1935)

Services
Preceding station	LDz	Following station
Garupe towards Riga	Riga–Skulte Railway	Gauja towards Skulte
Location
- Location within Latvia

Carnikava Station is a railway station serving the village of Carnikava in Carnikava Parish, Ādaži Municipality, Vidzeme, Latvia. It is located on the Zemitāni–Skulte Railway. The train services to and from the station are operated by the national railway company Vivi which run frequent train services between Riga and Skulte.

The station was put into service on 26 October 1933 as the then-terminus stop of the line (the railway bridge over the Gauja was completed in 1934 and the line was thus extended). The station building was unveiled in 1934 or 1935, and it was built, using parts of disassembled station buildings on the former Daugavpils–Rītupe Railway line.

The building features premises for railway personnel. The ticket office of the building was closed in 2025.
