= Saurieši =

Village in Latvia

Coordinates: 56°55′N 24°22′E

Saurieši is a village in Stopiņi Parish, Ropaži Municipality in the Vidzeme region and the Riga Planning Region of Latvia. It has a population of around 2100 people. The village is 4.89 square kilometers large.
