= Skulte Parish =

Parish of Latvia

- parish of Latvia
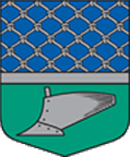
- Coat of arms

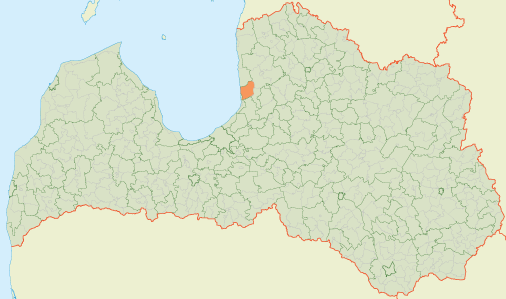
- Coordinates: 57°22′20″N 24°30′36″E
- Country: Latvia

Population (1 January 2026)
  - Total: 3,174

Skulte Parish (Latvian: Skultes pagasts) is an administrative unit of Limbaži Municipality, Latvia. It was an administrative unit of Limbaži district.

== Towns, villages and settlements of Skulte Parish ==
- Mandegas - parish administrative center
- Skulte
