= Loja, Latvia =

Village in Latvia

Loja
- village
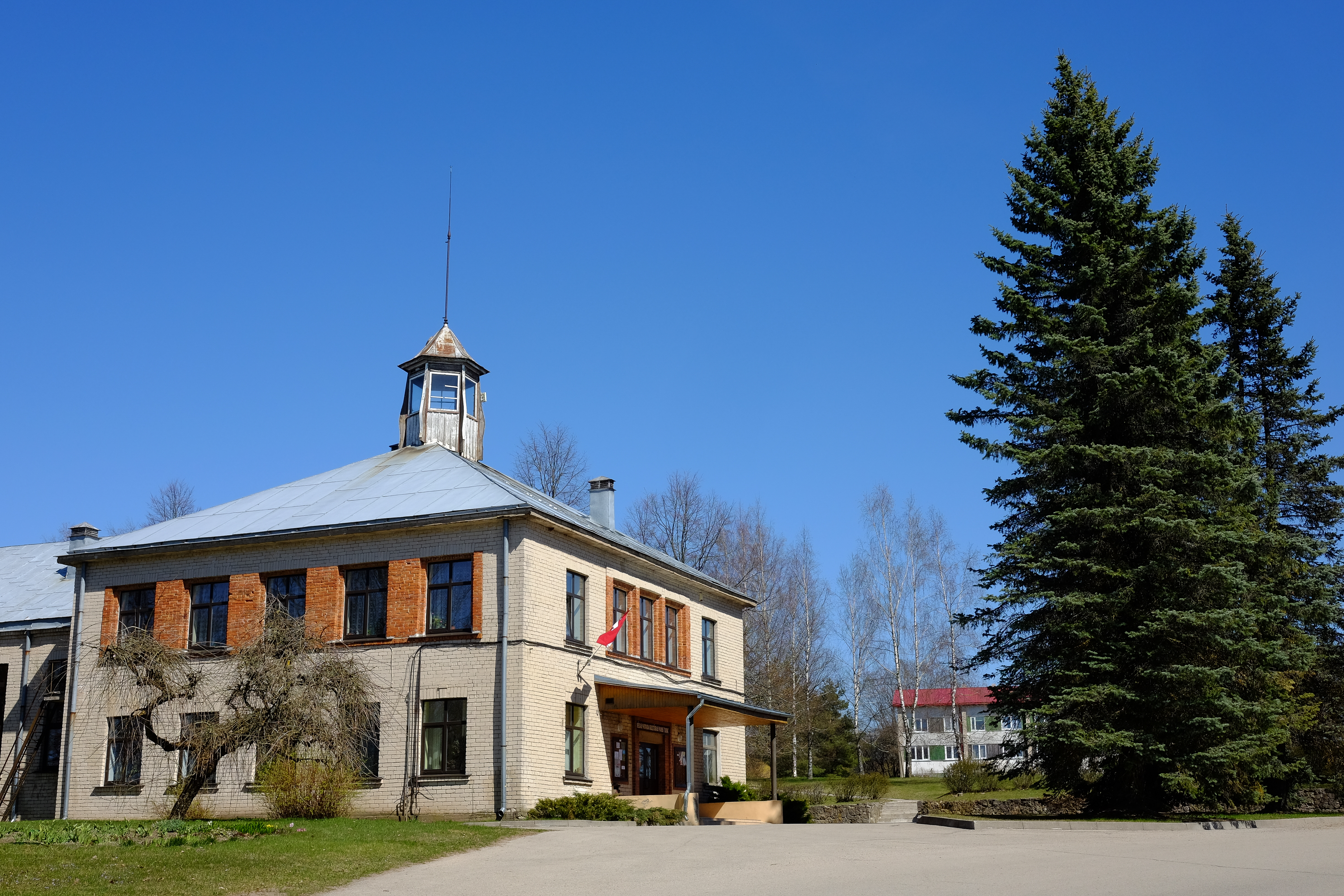
- Municipal House of Culture in Loja

- Location within Latvia
- Country: Latvia
- Municipality: Saulkrasti Municipality
- Elevation: 55 m (180 ft)

Population
  - Total: 367
- Post code: LV-2142

Loja (German: Lose) is a village in Saulkrasti Municipality in the Vidzeme region of Latvia.
