= Saulkrasti =

Town and capital of Saulkrasti Municipality, Latvia

- Town
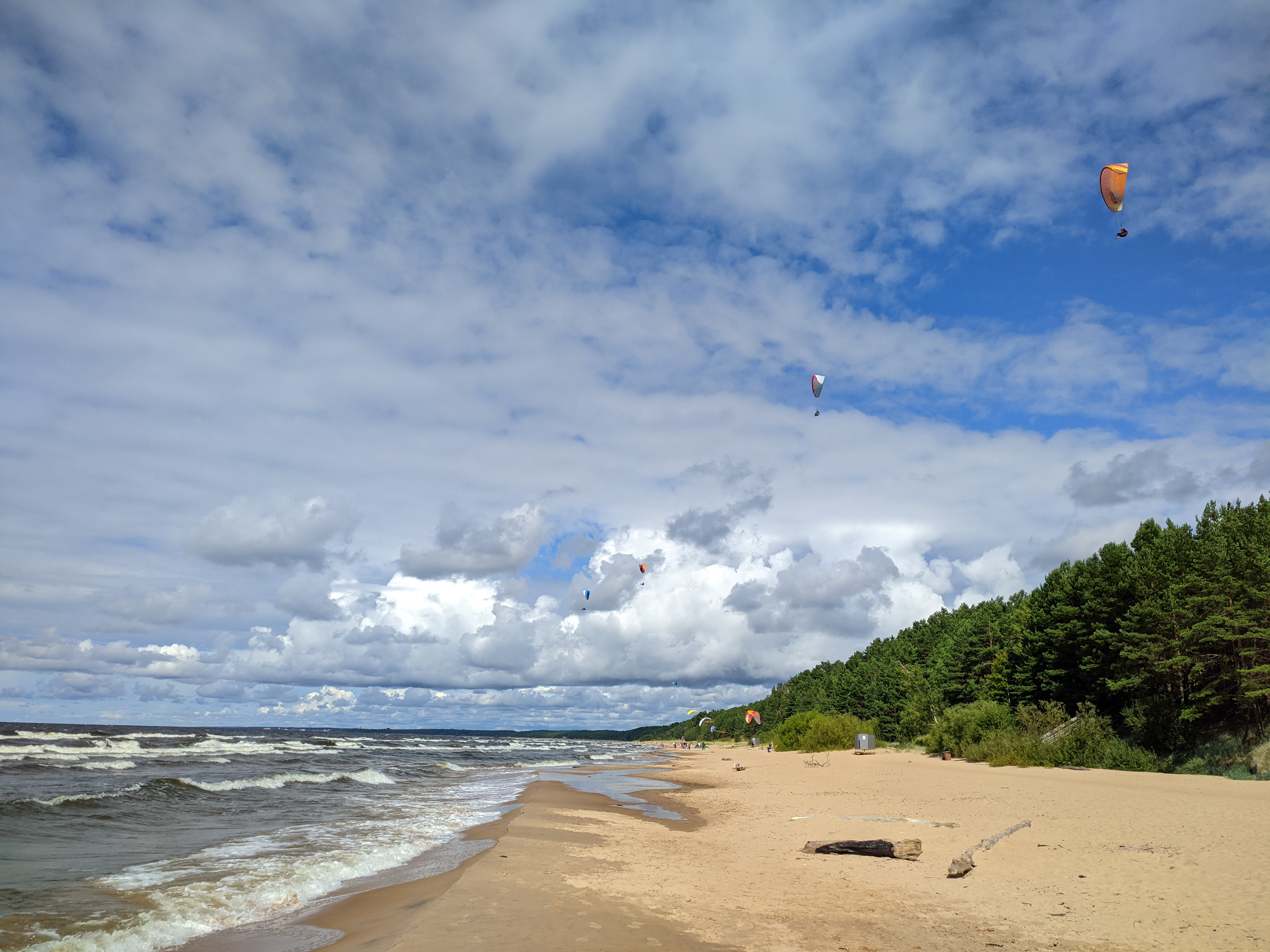
- Saulkrasti beach

- Flag Coat of arms
- Interactive map of Saulkrasti
- Location in Latvia
- Coordinates: 57°15′49″N 24°24′59″E
- Country: Latvia
- Municipality: Saulkrasti municipality
- Town rights: 1991

Area
  - Total: 13.77 km^{2} (5.32 sq mi)
  - Land: 13.33 km^{2} (5.15 sq mi)
  - Water: 0.44 km^{2} (0.17 sq mi)
  - Rural territory: 42 km^{2} (16 sq mi)
- Elevation: 12 m (39 ft)

Population (2026)
  - Total: 5,311
  - Density: 398.4/km^{2} (1,032/sq mi)
- Time zone: UTC+2 (EET)
  - Summer (DST): UTC+3 (EEST)
- Postal code: LV-2160
- Calling code: +371 67
- Website: http://www.saulkrasti.lv/en/

Saulkrasti (German: Neubad, literally Sun shores in Latvian) is a town and the administrative center of Saulkrasti Municipality in the Vidzeme region of Latvia, on the east coast of the Gulf of Riga. Made up of a number of historic fishing settlements, the town stretches for some 17 km from the Inčupe river in the south to the village of Skulte in the north. The town itself spans across 4.8 square kilometres (1.9 sq mi) and includes an additional 42 square kilometres (16 sq mi) of fields and forests.

The center of Saulkrasti is situated about 40 km from Sigulda, 45 km from Riga, 47 km from Limbaži, and 58 km from Salacgrīva. The territory of the Saulkrasti municipality is crossed by the European route E67, known locally as Via Baltica or the A1 road. There are six train stations in Saulkrasti and its suburbs - Inčupe, Pabaži, Saulkrasti, Ķīšupe, Zvejniekciems, and Skulte, the latter being the final stop on the Zemitāni-Skulte Railway line.

The coat of arms of Saulkrasti represents the four rivers (white stripes) of Inčupe, Pēterupe, Ķīšupe, and Aģe, and the five villages (green stripes) – Bādciems, Katrīnbāde or Pabaži, Pēterupe, Neibāde, and Zvejniekciems that make up the town. The top parts represent the sea and the sun. A part of the historic Livonian Metsepole land and later known as Neibāde or Neubad, Saulkrasti received its present name in 1933 when the five adjoining villages were merged into one common municipal structure. It received town rights in 1991.

Saulkrasti is the home of the annual Saulkrasti Jazz Festival.

== Geography ==
Saulkrasti is located in Saulkrasti municipality, on the south-east side of Gulf of Riga, 40 kilometres (25 mi) north-east of Riga. It lies along a 17 kilometres (11 mi) long and 2–5 kilometres (1.2–3.1 mi) wide coastal forest zone from the south of Lilaste River and lake to Zvejniekciems including. The territory is made up of four distinct populated places — Pabaži (Inčupe River), Pēterupe (city centre, Pēterupe river), Neibāde (Ķīšupe River), and Zvejniekciems (Aģe River). The territory is adjacent to Carnikava, Ādaži, Sēja, and Limbaži municipalities and the closest populated places to Saulkrasti are Carnikava, Ādaži, Sigulda, and Limbaži. The direct town's borders mostly include a stretch between the railway and the sea from Inčupe to Ķīšupe rivers.

The territory is 4,774.2 hectares (18.433 mi^{2}), from which 604.4 hectares (2.334 mi^{2}) are town's territory and 4,169.8 hectares (16.100 mi^{2}) rural territory. As of 2008 2,824.5 hectares (10.905 mi^{2}) are occupied by forest and 246.2 hectares (0.951 mi^{2}) are used for agriculture. There are 5,830 separate owned land territories with 1,583 real estates.

== History ==
The earliest data about the territory are stone axes found around Inčupe and Pēterupe, which show that the territory was populated from at least the newer ice age. The first written mention of populated places in the Saulkrasti territory are documented in the Livonian Chronicle of Henry. The territory overlapped with Livonian Metsopole and Kubesele populated place, and some today's names are inherited from the Livonian language, for example, Līlaste, Aģe, Pabaži. Metsepole significant centres included Skulte, Liepupe, and Limbaži villages. A significant road crossed the territory towards Soontagana territory in Estonia. After the 13th century Baltic Crusades, Saulkrasti lands became part of newly formed Krimulda parish.

Before the formation of Saulkrasti, the territory was a part of Bīriņi parish. The current Saulkrasti territory gradually formed by merger of several populated places on Inčupe, Pēterupe, and Ķīšupe river banks. In 1823 the Neibāde territory formed next to Ķīšupe River and was mostly Vidzeme's noblemen recreation and swimming spot that became quite popular after World War I. In 1898 Katrīnbāde swimming spot formed as Pabaži Manor estate was divided into summerhouse territories. In 1920 construction plans were conceived for Neibāde and Pēterupe towns.

=== Pēterupe ===
After World War I and coastland town reforms during the 1920–30s, unions, cooperatives, and various associations were established across Latvia. After World War I the fishermen village Pēterupe gathered the vicinage's economic life, including markets and association life. In 1919 Pētērupe Fishing Association (Latvian: Pēterupes Zvejniecības biedrība) was established to represent interests of the fishermen, and purchase land and fishing tools. In 1923 the association moved into Bīriņi Manor Pub (Latvian: Bīriņu muižas krogs), illegally sold by Neibāde resort manager Paul Moltrecht. The pub was renovated, renamed Enkurs (English: Anchor), and became the local fishermen social gathering place with regular shows, concerts, and lectures. The association had plans to build a port on the mouth of Pēterupe River, however construction never started. The association was closed on May 1, 1938, by Fishermen's Central Union (Latvian: Zvejnieku Centrālbiedrība), whereby many fishermen joined Skulte's Zvejniekciems cooperative.

=== Neibāde ===
Neibāde at the time was a quiet summer resort location preferred by Rigans for its quiet region between Pabaži and Skulte. The major local activity was at the local pub Āķu krogs (English: Hook pub) that housed public services, such as, a shop, a conference room, hairdressers, and a library. During the 1920s the pub exerted particular cultural influence and was supported by the State Cultural Fund (Latvian: Valsts kultūras fonds) on numerous occasions. That year Pēterupe Cooperative Consumer Association (Latvian: Pēterupes kooperatīva patērētāju biedrība) was founded to provide their members with discount groceries and manufacturing goods; the Āķu Pub rented office space to the cooperation. The cooperative organized many cultural events, such as, a drama club, a choir, and lectures. In 1927 a separate location was allocated for construction of a new headquarters building, however it was never finished due to ineffective governing and the cooperative almost going bankrupt. The cooperative prominently sold merchandise on debt to workers, especially fisherman, and soon exhausted its resources and in 1932 held a public auction. After the May 15, 1934 coup d'état by Prime Minister Kārlis Ulmanis the cooperative was suspended, forbidden, and on April 9, 1935 — disbanded. That year Neibāde was renamed Saulkrasti.

After World War II Saulkrasti and Inčupe workers village territory stretched 6 kilometres (3.7 mi) along a 1 kilometre (0.62 mi) wide maritime territory north of Inčupe. Saulkrasti as a town was established in 1945. The town's executive committee led by Mārtiņs Lasmanis settled in Baron Alexis von Pistohlkors' (Note: Transehe-Roseneck, Astaf von (1935). Genealogisches Handbuch der livländischen Ritterschaft (in German). Görlitz. p. 1021.) previous cottage. During this time former guesthouses, restaurants, pubs, larger cottages, as well as a rectory were nationalized. The territory remained quiet in the 1930–50s and was given worker town rights in 1950.

=== Skulte Port ===
At the start of the 20th century there had been several ports in Courland, but none in Vidzeme. Various ports were being built across Latvia and In 1911 the Ministry of trade and industry (Latvian: Tirdzniecības un rūpniecības ministija) began researching Neibāde and Pēterupe beaches for a suitable port location. Neibāde at the time was a busy cultural and commercial location and Skule village was the largest fishing centre in Vidzeme with 100 fishermen and 40 motorboats, who in 1932 they joined Sea Fish (Latvian: Jūras zivs) cooperative. The mouth of Aģe, which had served as a port before and was then used for boat towing, was selected as the most suitable and cheapest location for port construction. After years of inactivity, On May 21, 1937, president Kārlis Ulaminis decided to build the port. The construction started in autumn 1937 with building of south mole and afterwards north mole. On September 30, 1938, port coastline plans were conceived. Along the port construction, nearby fish smoke-house was built. The port was opened on October 7, 1939.

=== Saulkraste region ===
In 1950 the Saulkraste region was formed by joining 19 local counties and 42 kolkhozes under the Latvian SSR decree "On the formation of countrysides in Latvian SSR" (Latvian: Par lauku rajonu nodibināšanu Latvijas PSR sastāvā). Many of the kolkhozes were merged and renamed after Party functionaries.

Sulkrasti town became the centre of the region that coordinated a wide territory led by M. Slosmanis. Party and Komsomol Committees, and the Saulkrastu Stars (English: Saulkrasti Ray) newspaper editorial were formed in the Stirnu pub (English: Doe Pub), now the hospital building. Finance, culture, and education departments and municipal administration were located in the Saulkrasti Town Hall, together with the Saulkrastu Stars typography. The region's paperwork was now handled locally instead of through Riga. Saulkrasti village was the center of Saulkrasti Region until January 1957.

The only public transport to Riga was the often full intercity bus, as railway lines had been detonated by Germans at the end of World War II. On July 3, 1952, a railroad line to Saulkrasti was restored and electrified in 1958.

During this time new establishments and workforce increased demand for shops, catering, and other public services. Saulkraste region Consumer Society opened and began a trade organization within the region. In 1950 the town market was opened at the planned location of Pēterupe Cooperative Consumer Association's headquarters. However, public services developed slowly and had poor customer service. Later in 1952 there were several canteens, teahouses, two shops and a meat product shop. In 1952 a regional hospital was opened.

On July 16, 1950, Saulkraste Region held its first Song Festival. Saulkrastes Stars reports it as a colourful and solemn with many participants. On July 8, 1951, the state's first Fisherman Day (Latvian: Zvejnieku svētki) was held with thousands of participants. In autumn 1950 a high school and night school opened, and next year a renovated kindergarten. In 1953 a new high school project was approved and construction began autumn 1954 until the school opened September 1, 1956. The construction was one of the biggest region's buildings costing 2 million roubles.

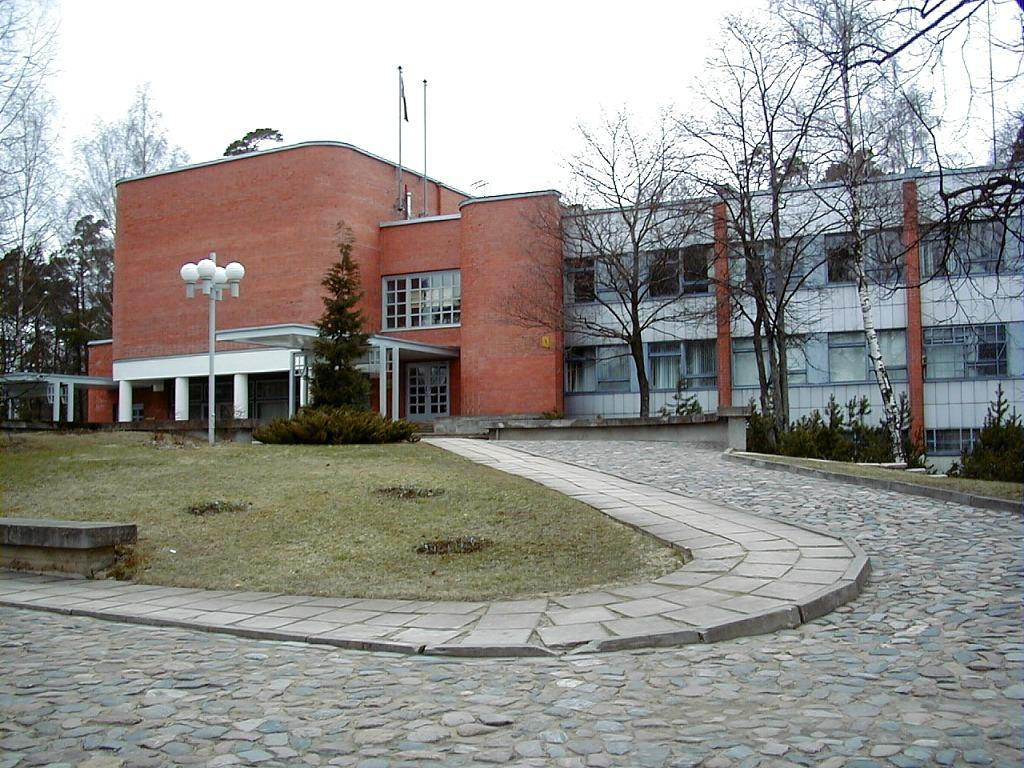
Town hall of Saulkrasti

The culture saw a decrease in 1952, choir and dance collectives disbanded and Culture House management was being constantly changed. Zvejnieks also saw cultural decline with finances missing for musical equipment. The wall newspaper Zvejnieks now had irregular publishings. However, soon a traveling cinema and library opened at the end of 1952 and 1953 respectively. Several dance and singing collectives were organized in Zvejnieks in 1954. On July 18 Saulkrasti Song Day (Latvian: Saulkrastu Dziesmu diena) was organized with visitors from many regions. On July 5, 1955, Saulkrasti Song Festival (Latvian: Saulkrastu Dziesmu svētki) was held with 600 singers and dancers and over 7,000 spectators. At the end of July 1956, the first Latvia SSR's young tourist rally takes place with participants and visitors from many USSR republics.

The region, village, and local newspaper carried "Saulkraste" name for almost two years from 1950 to middle of 1952 until Saulkrasti name was restored in 1952. In 1957 a new territorial reform in Latvia disbanded the Saulkrasti region.

=== Rise of fishing industry ===
Vidzemes beaches had long been housing fishing industry. In 1945–1946 fishermen started joining into unions and in 1946–1948 into artels. There were 16 artels in Latvia, and 5 in Vidzeme — the largest being 9. maijs (English: May 9), Zvejnieks (English: Fisherman), and Brīvais vilnis (English: The free wave). Fishing kolkhozes received funds for tool production and installation. Press reported artel Zvejnieks having twice exceeded their initial plan by skillful use of new equipment and increase of their fishing fleet. The first year following region's establishment, fishermen already towed a successful catch.

A lot of Saulkraste attention was directed at kolkhoz construction — allocating long-term loans, supplying building materials, and educating construction specialists. In 1950 region's kolkhoz construction was funded by 328,000 roubles. Kolkhozes competed socially in timber processing, land cultivation, grain sowing and harvesting, milking, and fish hauling.

The 39 kilometres (24 mi) long Aģe river creek houses the Skulte fishing port (Latvian: Skultes zvejas osta), where artel's ships and motorboats anchored. Next to the port was located Vidzeme's second largest Skulte fish canning factory (Latvian: Skultes zivju konservu fabrika) office. Fish salting workshop, freezer, fish smokery and cannery were one of the most modern in Vidzeme. The factory served all local fisherman. Big catches prompted expansion and construction of new of Skultes fish processing workshops (Skultes zivju apstrādāšanas cehi), and factory expanded yearly. New equipment, semi-automated lines, and freezers were being built; work organization was being revamped. If the factory only made fish products before 1956, canned fish now became its primary produce. Production was exported to many countries, such as, Great Britain, France, Australia, Mexico, etc.

During this time fishermen life significantly improved, new electrified houses were built in 1955–56 on the banks of Aģe. One of that time's state's biggest and modern Culture Houses (Latvian: Kultūras nams) opened on November 8, 1956, in Zvejniekciems on Aģe's left side and cost 2.5 million rubles. Soon Culture House opens a drama club and library.

== Population ==
As of beginning of 2008, there are 6,089 Saulkrasti residents, 2,771 of which live in rural areas. 57% (3,487) residents are of working age and 26% (1,611) beyond working age. 82% of the population are Latvians and 11% are Russians, the remaining Belarusian, Polish, Lithuanian and Estonian nationalities make up 7% of the population.

Saulkrasti population between 1997 and 2008

Year	Pop.	±%
1997	5,528	—
1998	5,560	+0.6%
1999	5,541	−0.3%
2000	5,532	−0.2%

Year	Pop.	±%
2001	5,427	−1.9%
2002	5,463	+0.7%
2003	5,403	−1.1%
2004	5,651	+4.6%

Year	Pop.	±%
2005	5,926	+4.9%
2006	6,032	+1.8%
2007	6,040	+0.1%
2008	6,089	+0.8%

== Economy ==
=== Tourism ===
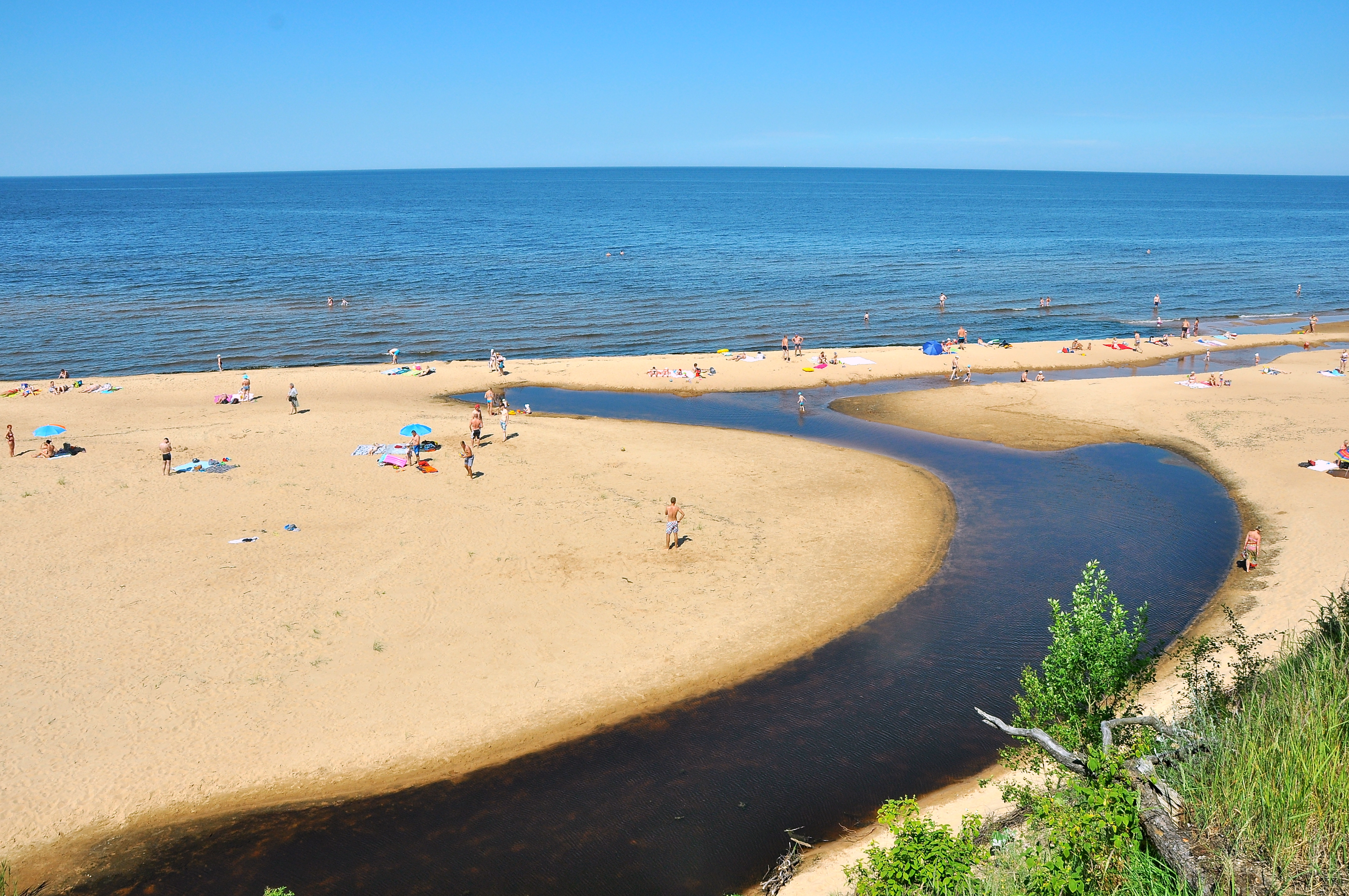
Beach in Saulkrasti

Saulkrasti attracts local and foreign tourists during the summer period.

In 2011, most visitors were from Russia, Germany, Lithuania, Estonia, and Finland. In addition, 2011 has seen increase in bicycle touring through the city.

=== Skulte fishing port ===
The port is currently being funded from European Fisheries and European Regional Development Funds for over 5 million lats for construction of two new piers and a warehouse complex. With the completion of these constructions, the port will have completed reconstruction started in 1997. Currently one of the pier has been completed and work is under way to finish the warehouses by 2010/11.

== Education ==
Saulkrasti high school (Latvian: Saulkrastu vidusskola) was attended by 360 pupils in 2008/2009 and employed 38 teachers in 2007/8.

Zvejniekciems high school (Latvian: Zvejniekciema vidusskola) was attended by 395 pupils in 2008/2009 and employed 27 teachers.

Vidzeme Music and Art school (Latvian: Vidzemes jūrmalas Mūzikas un mākslas skola) was established in 1968 as Zvejniekciems Children Art school (Latvian: Zvejniekciema Bērnu mūzikas skola). The school started its Art department in 1995 and was renamed to its current name in 1997. The school had 288 student in 2008. Students participated in several competitions and some of their work has been shown in international exhibitions.

Pre-school educational establishment "little gnome" (Latvian: Pirmsskolas izglītības iestāde „Rūķītis”) had 160 children and employed 22 teachers in 2008.

== International relations ==
=== Twin towns — Sister cities ===
Saulkrasti is twinned with:

- Gnesta Municipality, Sweden.

== See also ==
- List of cities and towns in Latvia
