= Skulte, Skulte Parish =

Village in Latvia

Skulte
- Village
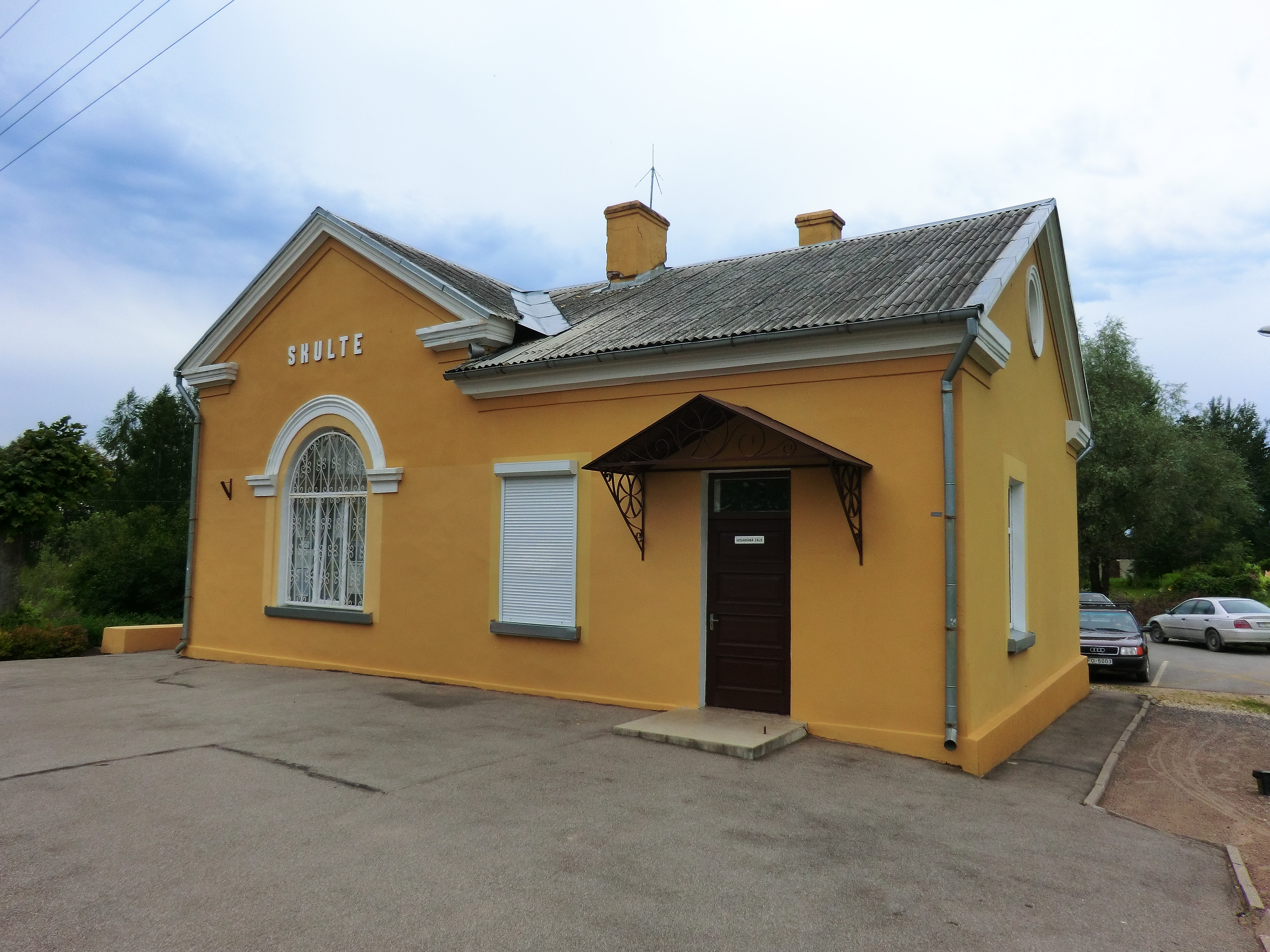
- Railway station in Skulte

- Skulte's location in Latvia
- Coordinates: 57°19′44.18″N 24°26′51.59″E
- Country: Latvia
- Municipality: Limbaži
- Parish: Skulte

Area
  - Total: 3.53 km^{2} (1.36 sq mi)
- Elevation: 20 m (66 ft)

Population (2022)
  - Total: 895
- Post code: LV-4025 Skulte
- Climate: Dfb

Skulte (German: Adiamünde) is a village in the Skulte Parish of Limbaži Municipality in the Vidzeme region of Latvia. It is the administrative centre of Skulte Parish.

== History ==
Skulte is an ancient settlement on the highway that led from Riga to Estonia. The ancient name of the county, Ademinde, comes from the Livonian word adia - edge and the German word Münde - mouth; "at the mouth of edge". Skulte became a larger settlement in the 1930s after the division of building plots in the territory of the former Skulte manor (Adiamünde). In 1933, Skultei was granted the status of a densely populated place (village). During the Latvian SSR between the railway and the parish border on both sides of Aģes several colonies (villages) of summer houses and small gardens were established along the river, which were later administratively included in the territory of Skulte village.

== Geography ==
=== Chapel ===
The Skulte burial chapel is an architectural monument of local importance.

=== Climate ===
Skulte has a humid continental climate (Köppen Dfb).

Climate data for Skulte (1991-2020 normals, extremes 1933-present)
Month	Jan	Feb	Mar	Apr	May	Jun	Jul	Aug	Sep	Oct	Nov	Dec	Year
Record high °C (°F)	8.4 (47.1)	11.0 (51.8)	19.0 (66.2)	28.1 (82.6)	30.1 (86.2)	33.1 (91.6)	33.2 (91.8)	35.0 (95.0)	30.2 (86.4)	21.9 (71.4)	15.0 (59.0)	11.2 (52.2)	35.0 (95.0)
Mean daily maximum °C (°F)	−0.4 (31.3)	−0.4 (31.3)	3.6 (38.5)	10.3 (50.5)	15.8 (60.4)	19.5 (67.1)	22.3 (72.1)	21.7 (71.1)	16.9 (62.4)	10.3 (50.5)	4.7 (40.5)	1.4 (34.5)	10.5 (50.9)
Daily mean °C (°F)	−2.6 (27.3)	−2.9 (26.8)	0.3 (32.5)	5.8 (42.4)	11.1 (52.0)	15.2 (59.4)	18.1 (64.6)	17.5 (63.5)	12.9 (55.2)	7.3 (45.1)	2.7 (36.9)	−0.6 (30.9)	7.1 (44.7)
Mean daily minimum °C (°F)	−5.2 (22.6)	−5.7 (21.7)	−3.0 (26.6)	1.5 (34.7)	6.0 (42.8)	10.6 (51.1)	13.5 (56.3)	12.9 (55.2)	8.9 (48.0)	4.2 (39.6)	0.3 (32.5)	−2.8 (27.0)	3.4 (38.2)
Record low °C (°F)	−41.8 (−43.2)	−34.9 (−30.8)	−27.6 (−17.7)	−18.4 (−1.1)	−5.8 (21.6)	−2.3 (27.9)	3.8 (38.8)	0.3 (32.5)	−5.2 (22.6)	−12.2 (10.0)	−17.7 (0.1)	−32.7 (−26.9)	−41.8 (−43.2)
Average precipitation mm (inches)	50.8 (2.00)	39.9 (1.57)	36.7 (1.44)	37.5 (1.48)	47.4 (1.87)	71.5 (2.81)	75.2 (2.96)	80.0 (3.15)	54.9 (2.16)	78.4 (3.09)	59.2 (2.33)	51.2 (2.02)	682.7 (26.88)
Average precipitation days (≥ 1 mm)	12	9	8	8	8	9	9	10	9	12	12	12	118
Average relative humidity (%)	86.7	85.0	79.6	74.2	73.8	76.2	77.1	77.0	80.1	83.6	87.2	87.5	80.7
Source 1: LVĢMC
Source 2: NOAA (precipitation days, humidity 1991-2020)

== Demographics ==
=== Population changes ===
Within existing limits, according to CSB data.

Historical population
Year	Pop.	±%
1935	180	—
1970	255	+41.7%
1979	245	−3.9%
1989	318	+29.8%
2000	303	−4.7%
2011	431	+42.2%
2021	753	+74.7%
Source: Central Statistical Bureau of Latvia

Year	1935	2001	2006	2012	2013	2022
Inhabitants	180	184	308	438	469	895
