= Baltezers, Ādaži Municipality =

Village in Ādaži Municipality, Latvia

Coordinates: 57°02′26″N 24°18′55″E

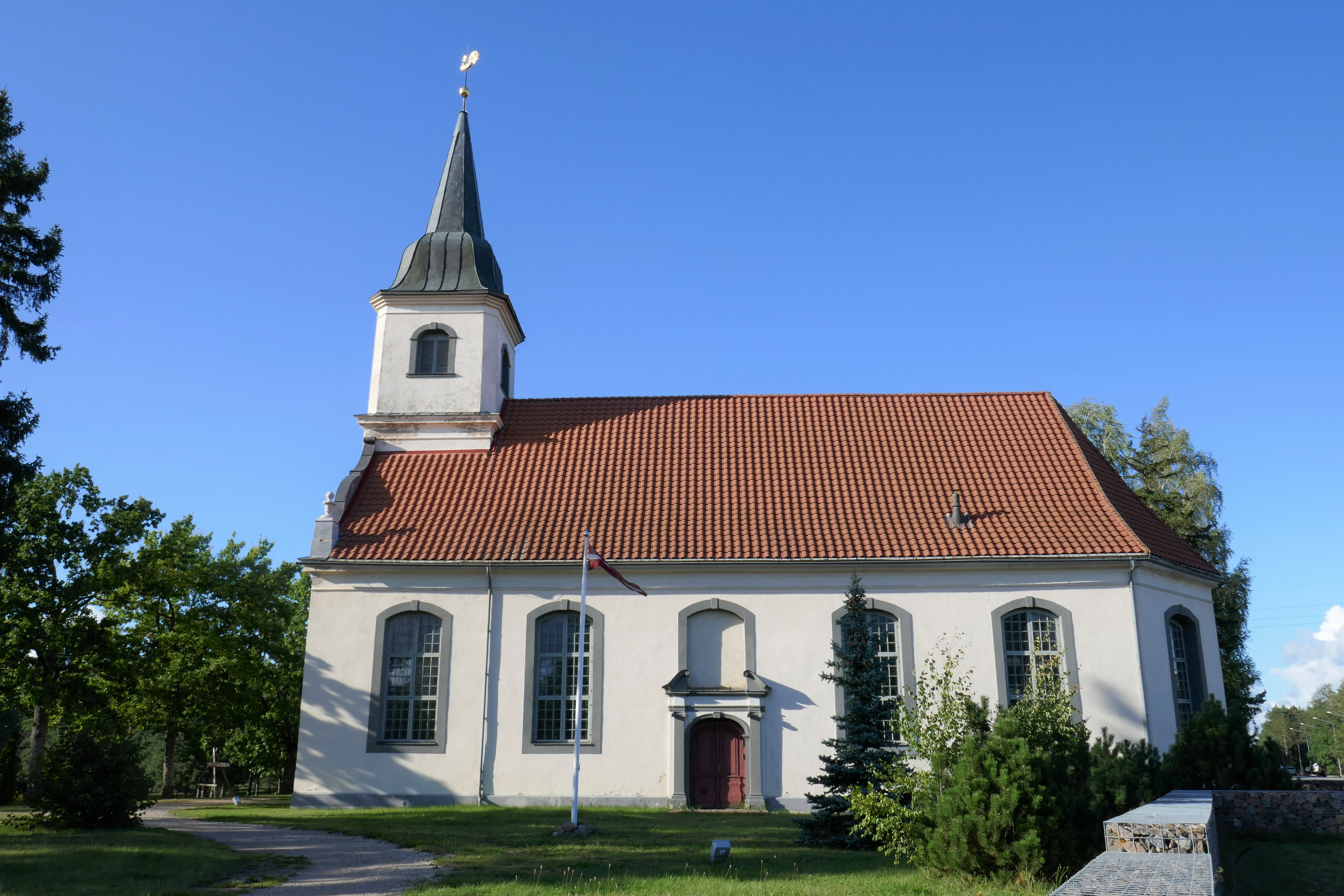
Baltezers Lutheran Church (1772)

Baltezers is a village in Ādaži Parish, Ādaži Municipality in the historical region of Vidzeme, and the Riga Planning Region in Latvia. It is sandwiched between the lakes of Lielais and Mazais Baltezers 4,4 km south of the municipal center of Ādaži. The A1 highway stretches through the village.

== History ==
Baltezers historically formed around the Ādaži-Bukulti Castle (Neuermühlen, 1287) as Baltezers-Bukulti surrounding the parish church. In 1562, Gotthard Kettler appointed Heinrich von Don as the landlord.

The village itself took its modern shape after World War II, as private housing grew around the land of the Baltezers (Ādaži) Lutheran Church, built in 1772.
