= Saulkrasti Municipality =

Municipality of Latvia

Coordinates: 57°15′N 24°25′E

Saulkrasti Municipality Saulkrastu novads
- Municipality
- Flag Coat of arms

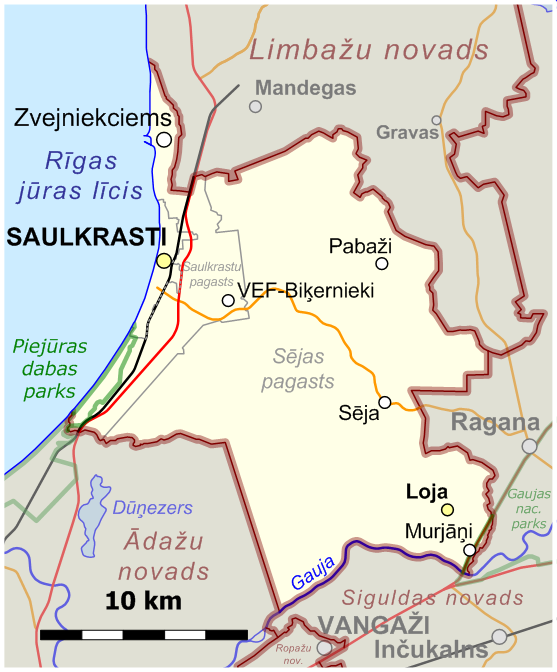
- Country: Latvia
- Formed: 2009
- Reformed: 2021
- Centre: Saulkrasti

Government
  - Council Chair: Normunds Līcis (LRA)

Area
  - Total: 277.80 km^{2} (107.26 sq mi)
  - Land: 269.86 km^{2} (104.19 sq mi)

Population (2026)
  - Total: 10,113
  - Density: 37.475/km^{2} (97.060/sq mi)
- Website: www.saulkrasti.lv

Saulkrasti Municipality (Latvian: Saulkrastu novads) is a municipality in Vidzeme, Latvia. The municipality was formed in 2009 by reorganization of Saulkrasti town with its countryside territory, with the administrative centre being Saulkrasti. In 2010 Saulkrasti parish was created from the countryside territory of Saulkrasti town. The population in 2020 was 6,735.

During the 2021 Latvian administrative reform, the previous municipality was merged with Sēja Municipality.

The total area of Saulkrasti municipality is 46.8 km^{2}. The administrative territory of Saulkrasti municipality is located on the coast of the Gulf of Riga, in the western part of Vidzeme. The territory of Saulkrasti municipality includes a coastal forest zone from the Lilaste River and the lake in the south to Zvejniekciems in the north. The administrative territory stretches for 17 kilometers. More than 6 thousand inhabitants are declared to live in the county. Along with the summer season, the population increases significantly, which is related to the beginning of the tourist season and the increase in the flow of horticultural cooperatives in the region. The distance from the center of Saulkrasti to Riga is 45 km, Limbaži - 47 km, Sigulda - 40 km, Salacgrīva - 58 km. The territory of the municipality is crossed by the international highway VIA Baltica. Four rivers flow through the county - Inčupe, Pēterupe, Ķīšupe and Aģe, which were symbolically depicted in the previous coat of arms of Saulkrasti Municipality as four silver bars.

== Population ==
Territorial unit	Population (year)
Saulkrasti	3149 (2024)
Saulkrasti Parish	4486 (2024)
Sēja Parish	2291 (2024)

== Twin towns — sister cities ==
Saulkrasti is twinned with:

- Gnesta, Sweden
- Neringa, Lithuania
- Odolanów, Poland
- Radashkovichy, Belarus

== Notable people ==
- Aleksandrs Klinklāvs (1899 in Saulkrasti Municipality – 1982), architect, noted for his works in the functionalist style.
- Edvīns Šnore (born 1974 in Saulkrasti), film director and politician; elected to a four-year term in the Latvian Saeima in 2014 and 2018.

== Images ==
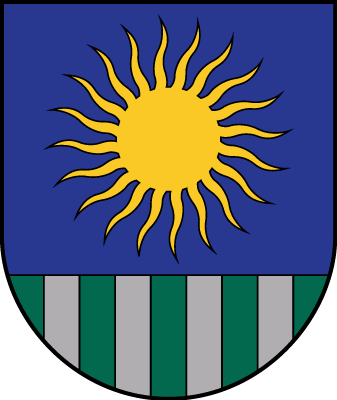
Coat of arms prior to 2021.

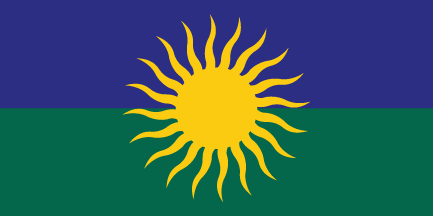
Flag prior to 2021.
