= Lysenko =

Lysenko (Ukrainian: Лисенко; Russian: Лысенко; Belarusian: Лысенка Lysienka) or Lisenko is a Ukrainian patronymic surname. It could have been derived from a nickname, either from the word лис (male fox) or лисий (bald). It most often refers to:

- Mykola Lysenko (1842–1912), Ukrainian composer and a central figure in Ukrainian music
- Trofim Lysenko (1898–1976), Soviet agronomist, politician and scientist

Other notable people with this surname include:

== Sports ==
- Alla Lysenko (born 1969), Ukrainian Paralympic rower
- Anastasiya Lysenko (born 1995), Ukrainian weightlifter
- Anna Lysenko (born 1991), Ukrainian boxer
- Dmytro Lysenko (born 1981), Ukrainian diver
- Lyudmila Lysenko (biathlete) (born 1973), Belarusian biathlete
- Lubov Zsiltzova-Lisenko, Ukrainian chess player
- Ruslan Lysenko (born 1976), Ukrainian biathlete
- Tatiana Lysenko (born 1975), Soviet and Ukrainian gymnast
- Tatyana Lysenko (born 1983), Russian hammer thrower

=== Football ===
- Oleksandr Lysenko (born 1956), Soviet-Ukrainian footballer
- Sergei Lysenko (footballer, born 1972), Russian footballer
- Sergei Lysenko (footballer, born 1976), Russian footballer
- Stanislav Lysenko (born 1972), Russian footballer
- Viktor Lysenko (1947–2003), Soviet footballer
- Volodymyr Lysenko (born 1988), Ukrainian footballer

== Other ==
- Anatoly Lysenko (1937–2021), Russian television figure, journalist, director, producer
- Māra Lisenko (born 1986), Latvian singer-songwriter
- Natalya Lisenko (1884–1969), Ukrainian-Russian actress
- Rada Lysenko (1921–2021), Ukrainian pianist
- Stefan Lysenko, Ukrainian-American film maker
- Vladimir Lysenko (born 1955), Russian traveller
