= Jaundubulti Station =

Railway station in Latvia

Jaundubulti
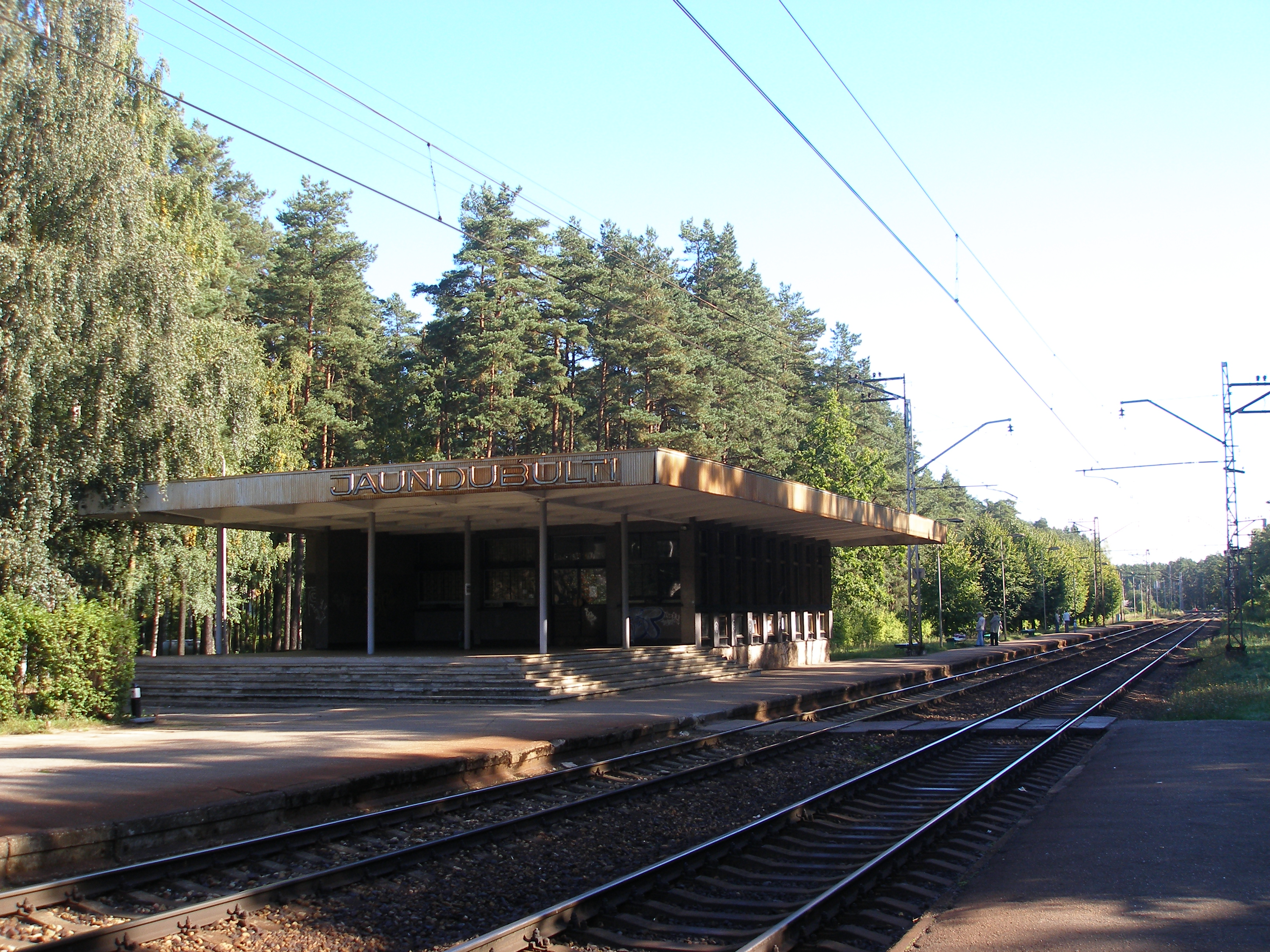

General information
- Location: Jaundubulti, Jūrmala; Latvia
- Coordinates: 56°57′39.70″N 23°45′25.41″E
- Platforms: 2
- Tracks: 2

History
- Opened: 1925
- Rebuilt: 1977

Services
| Preceding station | LDz | Following station |
|---|---|---|
| Pumpuri towards Tukums II | Torņakalns–Tukums II Railway | Dubulti towards Riga |
Location

Jaundubulti Station is a railway station serving the Jaundubulti neighbourhood of the city of Jūrmala, Latvia. The station is located on the Torņakalns–Tukums II Railway.
