= Pumpuri Station =

Railway station in Jūrmala, Latvia

Pumpuri
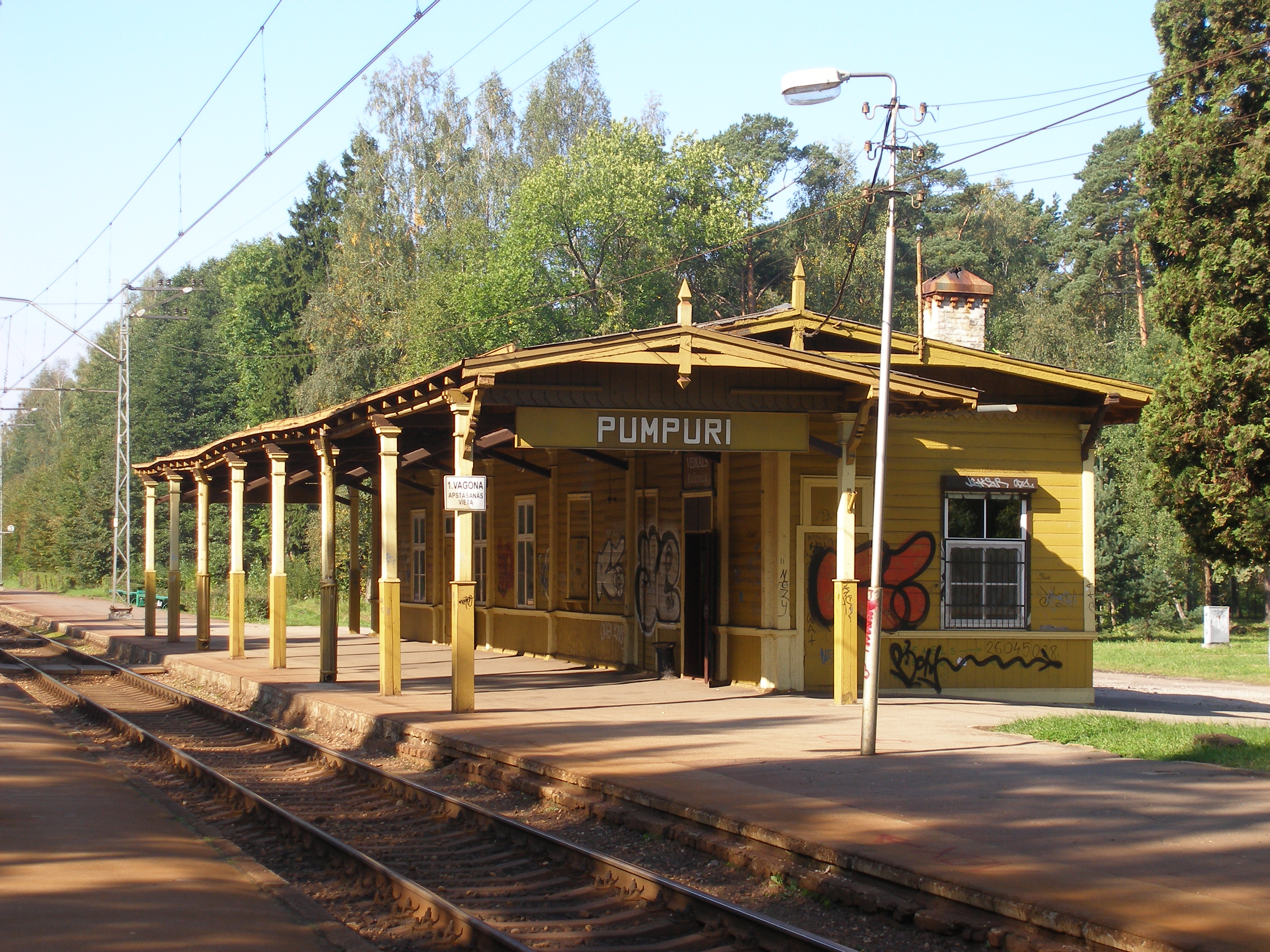

General information
- Location: Kronvalda iela 17; Pumpuri, Jūrmala; Latvia
- Coordinates: 56°57′36.27″N 23°44′12.03″E
- Line: Torņakalns – Tukums II Railway
- Platforms: 2
- Tracks: 2

History
- Opened: 1877
- Former names: Karlsbad; Karlsbad; I Melluži

Services
Preceding station	LDz	Following station
Melluži towards Tukums II	Torņakalns–Tukums II Railway	Jaundubulti towards Riga
Location

Pumpuri Station is a railway station serving the Pumpuri neighbourhood of Jūrmala, Latvia. It is located on the Torņakalns – Tukums II Railway.
