= Lielupe Station =

Railway station in Jūrmala, Latvia

Lielupe
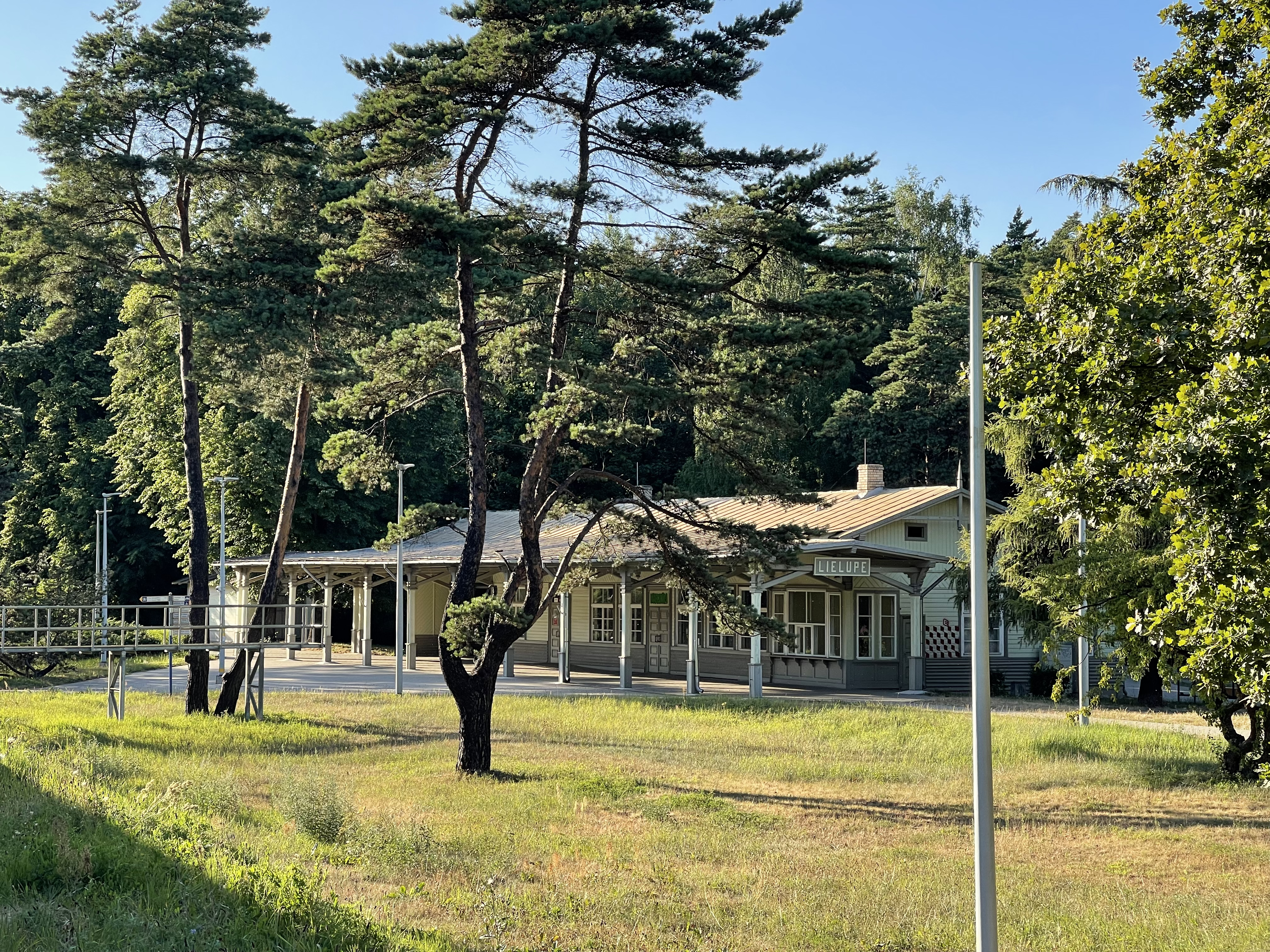

General information
- Location: Lielupes stacijas Lielupe, Jūrmala; Latvia
- Coordinates: 56°58′57″N 23°52′15″E
- Platforms: 2
- Tracks: 2

History
- Opened: 1913

Services
Preceding station	LDz	Following station
Bulduri towards Tukums II	Torņakalns–Tukums II Railway	Priedaine towards Riga
Location

Lielupe Station is a railway station serving the neighbourhood of Lielupe in the city of Jūrmala, Latvia. The station is located on the Torņakalns – Tukums II Railway.
