= Bulduri Station =

Railway station in Latvia

Bulduri
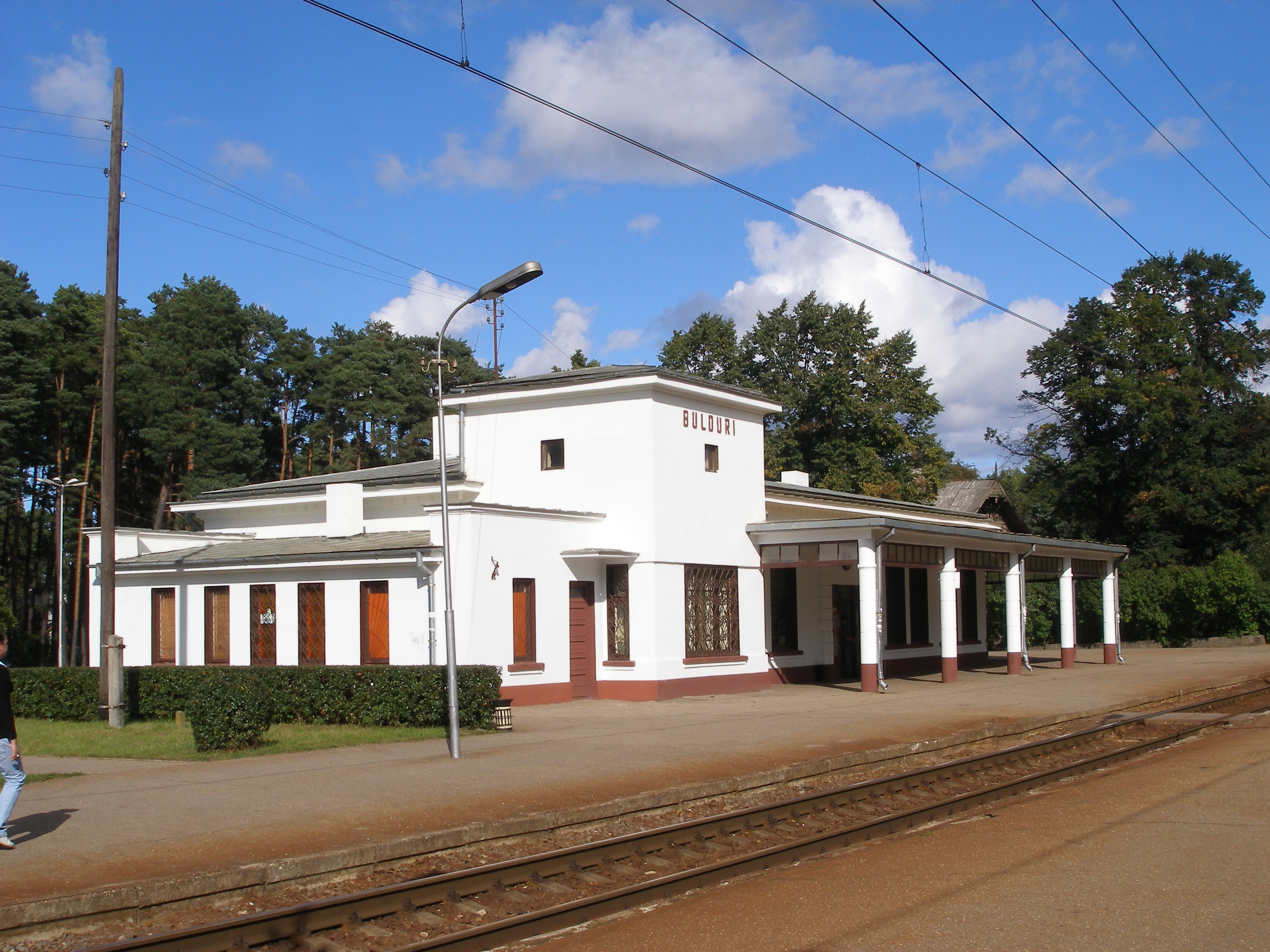

General information
- Location: Edinburgas prospekts 10A; Bulduri, Jūrmala; Latvia
- Coordinates: 56°58′52.91″N 23°51′7.71″E
- Platforms: 2
- Tracks: 2

History
- Opened: 1877
- Rebuilt: 1947

Services
Preceding station	LDz	Following station
Dzintari towards Tukums II	Torņakalns–Tukums II Railway	Lielupe towards Riga
Location

Bulduri Station is a railway station serving the neighbourhood of Bulduri in the city of Jūrmala, Latvia. The station is located on the Torņakalns – Tukums II Railway.
