= Dubulti Station =

Railway station in Latvia

Dubulti
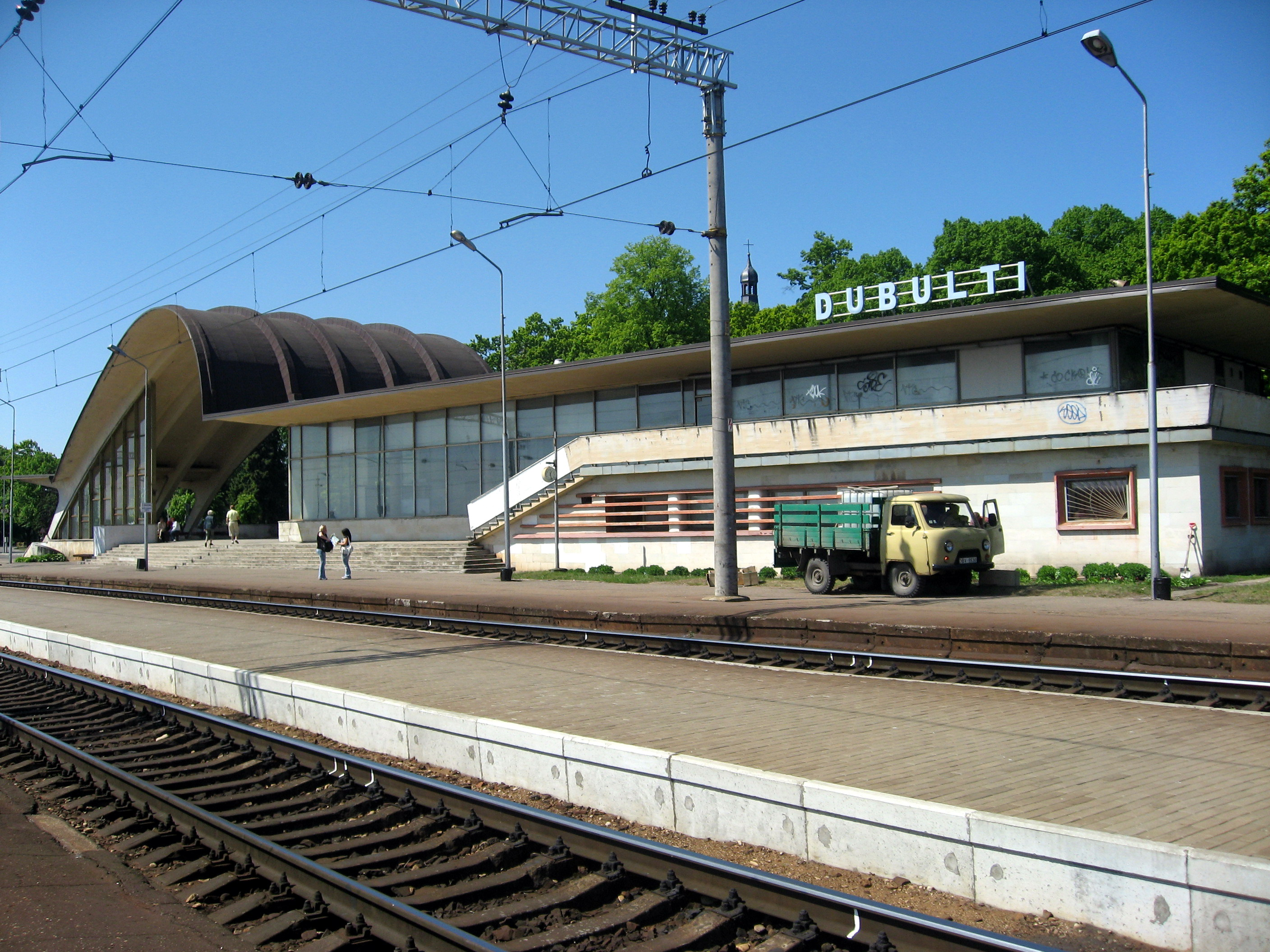

General information
- Location: Zigfrīda Meierovica prospekts 4. Dubulti, City of Jūrmala; Latvia
- Coordinates: 56°58′7.95″N 23°46′30.47″E
- Owner: Latvian Railways
- Platforms: 3
- Tracks: 3

Construction
- Architectural style: Modernist

History
- Opened: 1877
- Rebuilt: 1977
- Electrified: 1950

Services
Preceding station	LDz	Following station
Jaundubulti towards Tukums II	Torņakalns–Tukums II Railway	Majori towards Riga
Location

Dubulti Station is a railway station serving the Dubulti District of the city of Jūrmala, Latvia. The station is situated on the bank of the Lielupe River on the narrow isthmus between the river and the Gulf of Riga.

The station is located on the Torņakalns–Tukums II Railway of the Latvian Railways system. It opened in 1877.

== History ==
The first station here opened on 21 September 1877 as one of the original intermediate stops on the new railway line from Riga to Tukums via Jūrmala.

The current Modernist style concrete building was completed in 1977. The sculptural concrete shell structural section resembles a wave, and was claimed as the most modern station building in the Latvian Soviet Socialist Republic. It was designed by the Soviet architect Igor Yaveyn (1903—1980).

The station also had a refurbishment in 2015 removing one platform and modernizing the others.
