= Sergei Lysenko =

Sergei Lysenko may refer to:

- Sergei Lysenko (footballer, born 1972), Russian football player
- Sergei Lysenko (footballer, born 1976), Russian football player
