= Bulduri conference =

The Bulduri Conference (also known as the Baltic Conference) was a diplomatic meeting held from 6 August to 6 September 1920 in Bulduri, Latvia, bringing together representatives of several Baltic and neighbouring states to discuss political, economic, and military cooperation in the aftermath of the First World War.

Participating states included Estonia, Latvia, Lithuania, Finland and Second Polish Republic, with two more countries – Ukrainian People's Republic and Belarusian People's Republic joining uninvited. Ukraine has been admitted as a participant, while Belarus remained an observer.

In autumn 1919, representatives of Estonia, Latvia, Lithuania and Finland met in Tallinn and Tartu to coordinate foreign policy positions. These efforts continued in January 1920 at a conference in Helsinki, where Poland also participated, eventually leading to the conference in Bulduri.

== Treaty ==
On 31 August 1920, the following secret political treaty was agreed upon:

Article 1 – The participating states declared their readiness to grant each other de jure recognition where this had not already occurred.

Article 2 – The states agreed to resolve all border disputes and territorial issues exclusively by peaceful means. If no agreement could be reached, disputes were to be settled through third-party mediation, such as arbitration by the League of Nations.

Article 3 – The states undertook not to support or allow on their territory any activities directed against another participating state, including the organisation or transit of hostile military forces.

Article 4 – The participating states declared that they had not concluded, and would not conclude, agreements directed against any other state represented at the conference.

Article 5 – The states agreed to prepare a defensive military convention without delay.

Article 6 – The participating states guaranteed minority rights, including the preservation and free development of language and national organisations for minorities belonging to the contracting states.

Article 7 – Pending the conclusion of commercial treaties, the states agreed not to impose restrictions or special charges on goods in transit between them (with reservations by Poland and Ukraine).

Article 8 – Any state could withdraw from the treaty, with withdrawal taking effect one year after written notification to the other parties.

Article 9 – The treaty required ratification and would enter into force upon exchange of ratifications, no later than 15 December 1920.

Article 10 – If a participating state failed to ratify the treaty by that date, it would still enter into force among the remaining states. Non-ratifying states could accede later with the consent of the others.

The treaty was signed by representatives of the participating states: Lithuania (Jurgis Šaulys, Dovas Zaunius, Capt. V. Natkevičius, Dr. Vytautas Jonas Gylys); Finland (L. Astrom, Colonel Karl Birger Helsingius, Eikki Reijonen); Poland (Leon Wasilewski, Witold Kamieniecki, Adam Tarnowski); Estonia (Kaarel Robert Pusta, R. Eliaser, Colonel P. Lill); Latvia (Zigfrīds Anna Meierovics, Voldemārs Zāmuēls, General Pēteris Radziņš); and the Ukrainian People's Republic (Oleksandr Salikovsky, Volodymyr Kedrowsky).

== Aftermath ==
The proposed military convention had still not been agreed upon by 6 September, as Lithuania refused to enter into a defence arrangement with Poland, which remained at war with the Soviet Russia – a state with which Lithuania had already concluded the Soviet–Lithuanian Peace Treaty. At later point, the Treaty of Riga concluded on 18 March 1921, between Poland and Soviet Russia, Soviet Ukraine and Soviet Belarus has nullified the framework of the treaty.

== See also ==
- Warsaw Accord
