= Jaundubulti =

Neighbourhood of Jurmala, Latvia

Coordinates: 56°58′N 23°45′E

- Residential area
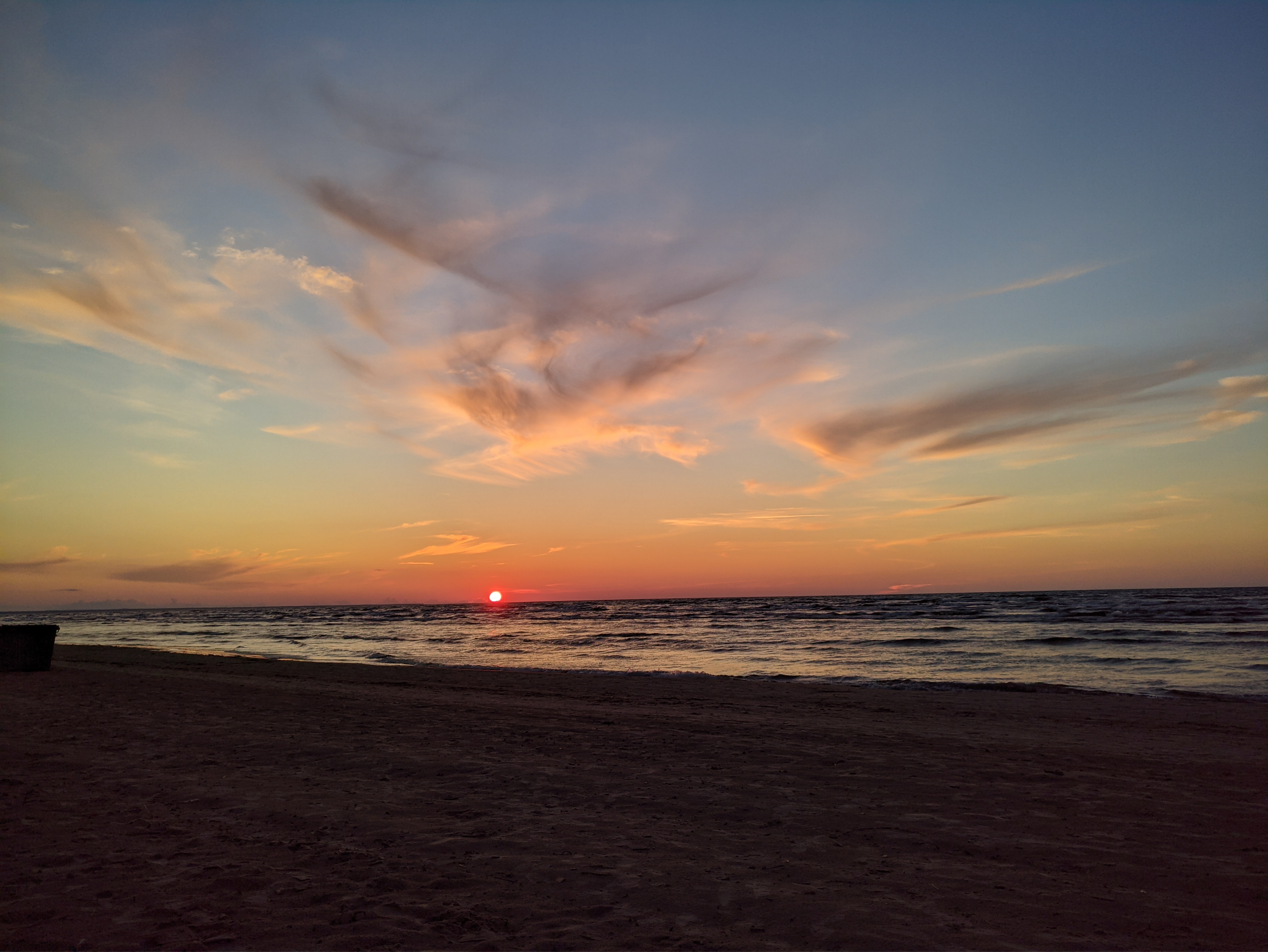
- Jaundubulti beach

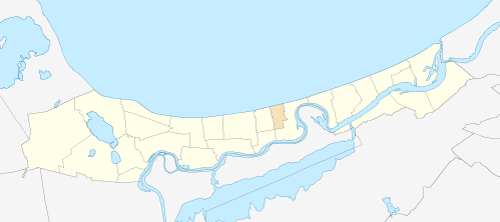
- Location in Jūrmala
- Country: Latvia
- City: Jūrmala

Area
  - Total: 1.3 km^{2} (0.50 sq mi)
- Elevation: 3 m (9.8 ft)

Population (2008)
  - Total: 588
  - Density: 452.3/km^{2} (1,171/sq mi)

Jaundubulti is a residential area and neighbourhood of the city Jūrmala, Latvia.

== History ==
The village was slowly populated during the 1870s, when railways were built near the area. The railways also created Edinburgh and Bulduri.

== Landmarks ==
=== Jaundubulti Secondary School ===
The Jaundubulti Secondary School is a school located in the village. It was built in 1870 by I. Felsko. In the 1960s, the school was demolished. However, it was rebuilt in 1969. In 1992, the school was renamed Jūrmala City Jaundubulti Secondary School.

=== Jaundubulti Station ===
Jaundubulti Station is a railway station on the Torņakalns – Tukums II Railway
