= Poliksena Shishkina-Iavein =

Russian suffragette and physician (1875–1947)

Poliksena Nestorovna Shishkina-Iavein
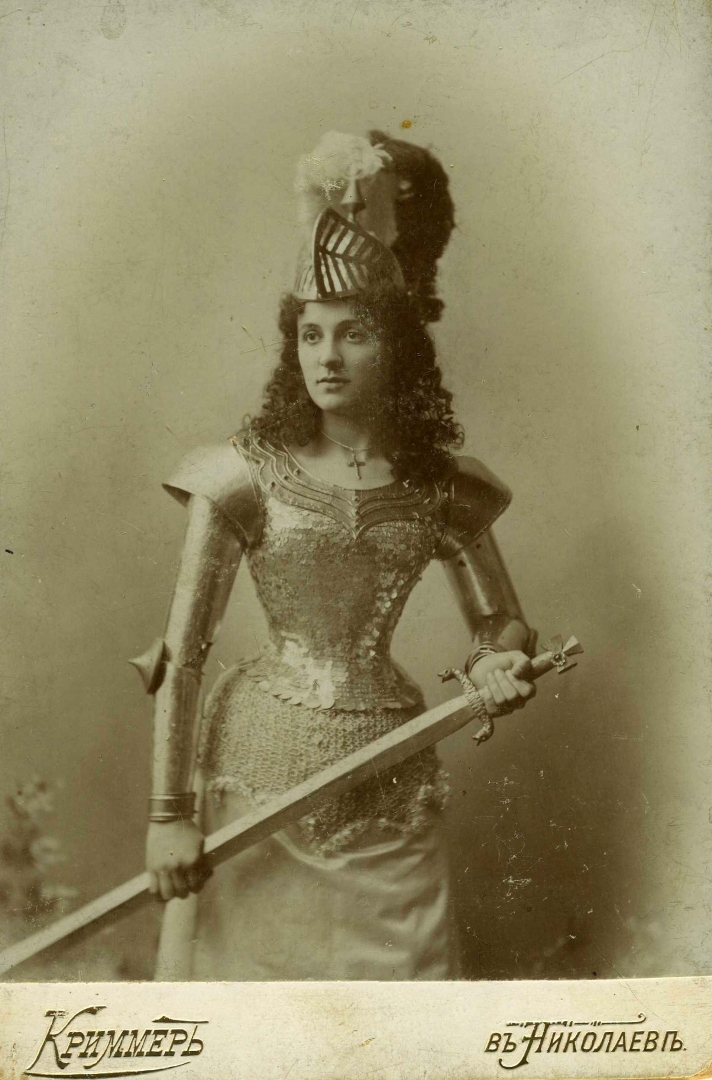
- Born: April 1875; Nikolaev, Russian Empire (now Mykolaiv, Ukraine)
- Died: March 1947 (aged 71); Leningrad, Russian SFSR, Soviet Union
- Education: St Petersburg Women's Medical Institute
- Occupations: Suffragette and physician
- Spouse: Georgi Iulievich Iavein

Poliksena Shishkina-Iavein (April 1875 – March 1947) was a Russian and Soviet suffragette and physician.

== Life ==
Poliksena Nestorovna Shishkina-Iavein was born in April 1875 in Nikolaev, Russian Empire (now Mykolaiv, Ukraine). She married a professor at the Medical-Surgical Academy, Georgi Iulievich Iavein, in 1900 while studying at the St Petersburg Women's Medical Institute. They had a daughter and a son, future architect Igor Yaveyn, together before she became one of the first women to graduate from the Institute in 1904. During World War I, Shishkina-Iavein taught medical courses, worked in a hospital for soldiers and helped to organize public canteens and women's shelters. The family left St Petersburg after the October Revolution of 1917 and moved to newly independent Estonia, but Shishkina-Iavein was not allowed to practice medicine there. After her husband's death in 1920, she returned to Leningrad (as St Petersburg was now named). She survived the Siege of Leningrad during World War II and died there in March 1947.

== Activities ==
Shishkina-Iavein became chairwoman of the All-Russian League for Women's Equality (Russian: Всероссийская лига равноправия женщин) in 1910 and changed the policy of the League from a general goal of universal democracy to a more-focused pursuit of women's suffrage through legislative action. It became the "largest and most powerful women’s political organization in Russia" during her tenure. Shishkina-Iavein wrote for the magazine Jus Suffragi, the official journal of the International Woman Suffrage Alliance, and had a lot of contacts with foreign feminists. The League was somewhat successful in improving women's rights during the Fourth State Duma of 1912–17.
