= Otto Ozols =

Latvian writer

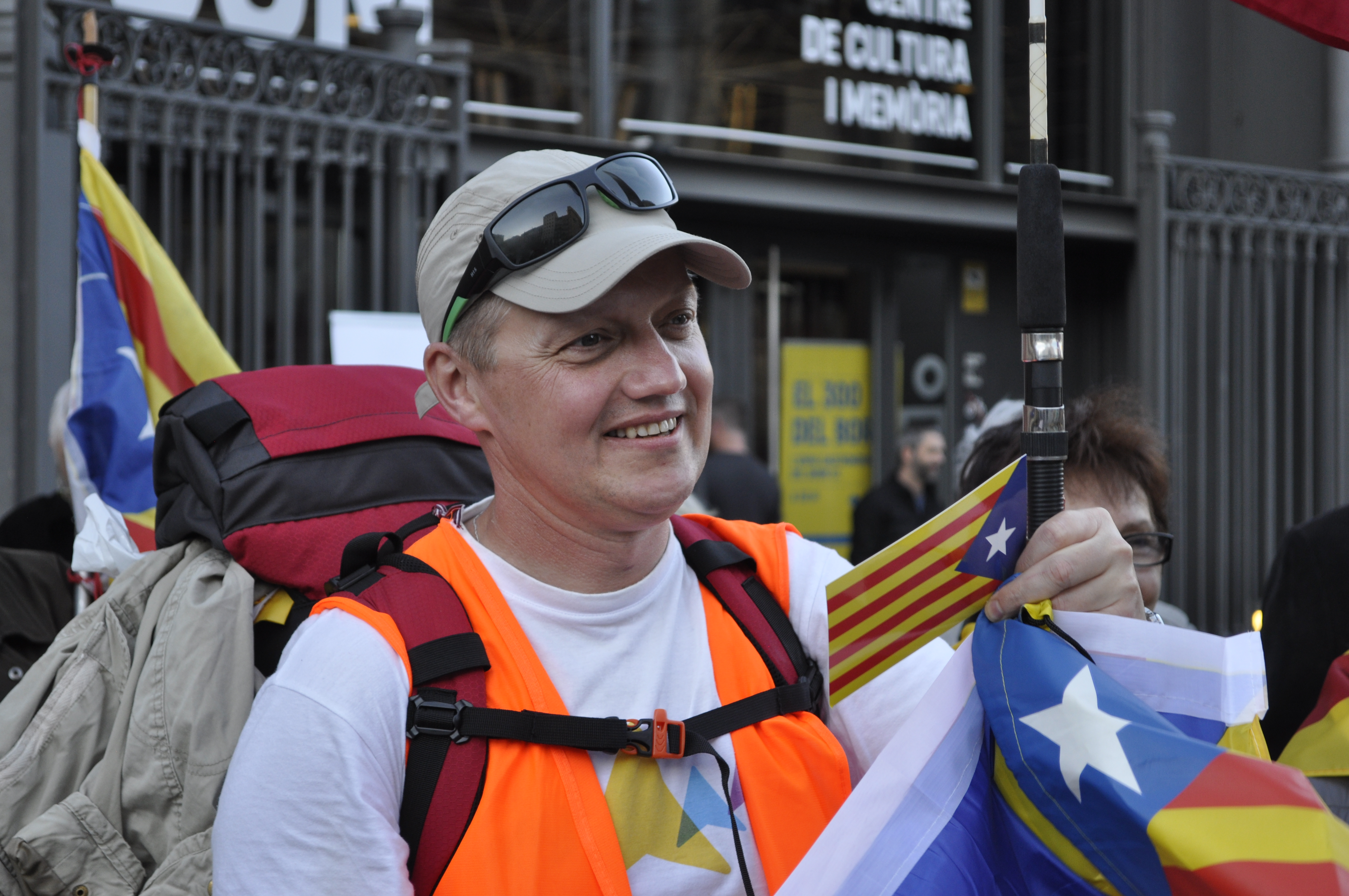
Otto Ozols in Barcelona on 13 April 2016 during his 480 km walk along the Catalan Way from the southern to the northern end of Catalonia.

Otto Ozols (Jūrmala, 23 August 1970), pen name of Mārtiņš Barkovskis, is a Latvian columnist, writer and social activist. Ozols’ first book, the novel "Latvieši ir visur" ("Latvians are Everywhere") became a bestseller in 2011, having gone through 11 reprints since then. The book has been translated into Swedish as "Letternas Revansch" and into Russian as "Они повсюду". He has written two more books, "Theodorus. Deja ar ziloņzivi" ("Theodorus. Dancing with the Elephant Fish"), published in 2014 and described as "Europe's answer to Britain's James Bond and America's Jason Bourne", and "Neērtās patiesības" (Uncomfortable truths), a collection of Ozols’ opinion pieces and articles on Latvian politics, published in 2015. Otto Ozols is also an actively engaged author of political essays and political analysis, and for several years he was a regular columnist for the largest news portals of Latvia, TVNET, DELFI and LA.lv.

== Social activism ==
To acquaint himself with the Catalan independence movement, Otto Ozols in April 2016 became the first known person to traverse on foot the entire length of the Catalan Way – in 16 days, 480 km. Before doing this, he had written in September 2013 and article linking Catalan independence with the Baltic Way and the history of Latvia. He visited 68 villages and met with hundreds of individuals. In Barcelona, the capital city of Catalonia, he met with Carme Forcadell, president of Catalonia's parliament at the time. He is expected to publish a book of collected materials and impressions on his walking trip.
