= Igor Yaveyn =

Soviet architect

Igor Georgievich Yaveyn (Iavein, Russian: Игорь Георгиевич Явейн, 3 October 1903 — 23 September 1980) was a Soviet architect, notable for projects of multiple railway stations in the Soviet Union, including these in Novgorod, Kursk, and Dubulti.

Yaveyn was born in Saint Petersburg in 1903. His father was the epidemiologist and a professor at the Medical-Surgical Academy Georgy Yulyevich Yaveyn (Iavein). His mother, Poliksena Shishkina-Iavein, was a physician as well and a notable suffragette. From 1923 till 1927 Yaveyn studied architecture at Leningrad Institute of Civil Engineering under Alexander Nikolsky, an avantguardist architect. Yaveyn's graduation project was a design of the Central Railway Station in Leningrad (never built), and subsequently as an architect he mostly designed railway stations.

In 1932, Yaveyn participated in a competition for the project of a new building of Kursky Railway Station in Moscow. Whereas he did not win the competition (his project was classified second, whereas no project was classified first, and the competition did not result in constructed of a building), he realized there for the first time the idea that a railway station is not an ordinary building but a transport connection site where the architecture must be determined by the flow of humans and vehicles. Specifically, his project treated the railway station building as a bridge above the platforms, with connections at different levels. It was a novel idea which at the time was not accepted, but in the 1960s much of the transport architecture in the Soviet Union was based on it.

In 1932, Yaveyn won a competition to build a house for the Svirstroy engineers in Leningrad. The building was completed in 1938 and was clearly a constructivist project even though at the time constructivist architecture was already rejected by Soviet authorities.

In 1945, just after the end of World War II, he won a competition to build the railway station in Kursk. The city was heavily damaged during the war and has not yet been rebuilt at the moment. Yaveyn chose a symmetric neo-classical building with the central section in the shape of an arch, thereby referring to a triumphal arch. Subsequently, he was commissioned a series of nearly identical small station buildings for the railway between Moscow and Kursk. Later, Yaveyn also built the railway station in Novgorod, which, in contrast to the one in Kursk, is an asymmetric building reminiscent of modern and uses some features of Old Novgorod architecture.
