= Pumpuri =

Neighbourhood of Jurmala, Latvia

Coordinates: 56.9644°N 23.7367°E

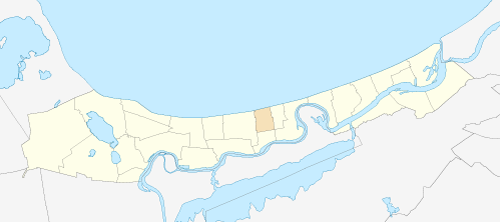
- Location in Jūrmala
- Country: Latvia
- City: Jūrmala

Area
  - Total: 1.7 km^{2} (0.66 sq mi)
- Elevation: 3 m (9.8 ft)

Population (2008)
  - Total: 523
  - Density: 307.7/km^{2} (797/sq mi)

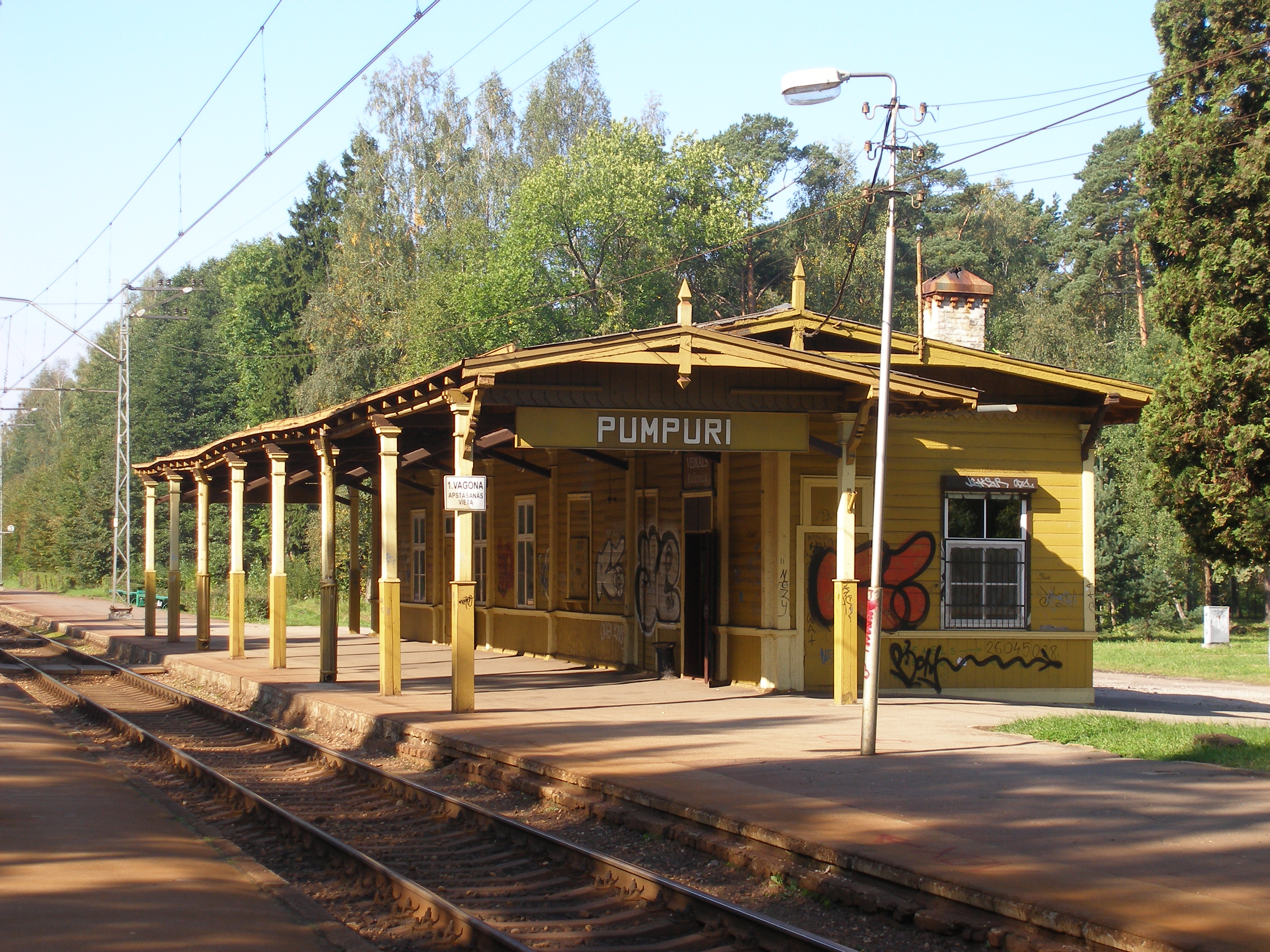
Pumpuri Station

Pumpuri is a residential area and neighbourhood of the city Jūrmala, Latvia.

The Pumpuri railway station was established in 1877.
