= Dubulti =

Neighbourhood of Jūrmala, Latvia

Coordinates: 56.97°N 23.77°E

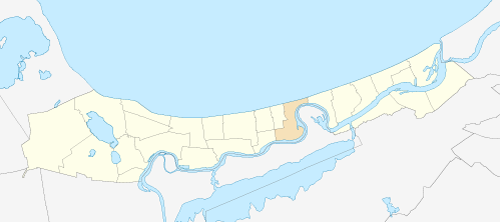
- Location in Jūrmala
- Country: Latvia
- City: Jūrmala

Area
  - Total: 3.7 km^{2} (1.4 sq mi)
- Elevation: 3 m (9.8 ft)

Population (2008)
  - Total: 2,588
  - Density: 699.5/km^{2} (1,812/sq mi)

Dubulti is the administrative center and the oldest part of Jūrmala, Latvia.

== History ==
The settlement derives its name from the Lett Dubults, who had an inn there in the 15th century. Dubulti however is first mentioned in the 18th century. A fishing settlement was later formed. After the Patriotic War of 1812, Dubulti became a rest point for those going to Courland. The first vacationing noblemen visited the local beaches in 1814. The Germans once called Dubulti 'Judenburg' because of Jewish inhabitants who had rights to settle there. In 1841 the settlement gained an official name, Dubbeln (Russian: Дуббельн).

Dubulti is situated where a meandering loop of River Lielupe creates an isthmus only 300 metres (980 ft) wide. Erosion from the river was a major problem in the 18th century and threatened the village. The road running close to the river had to be relocated behind the closest land plots to the current location at Zigfrīda Meierovica prospekts.

In 1920, Dubulti became the administrative centre of Rīgas Jūrmala. The Town Hall was built in 1930.

The inn of Dubults was demolished in the 1930s.

Among Dubulti's landmarks are the Lutheran church (built in 1907–09), “Marienbad” sanatorium founded by doctor Johan Christian Nordstroem in 1870 and an Orthodox church, built around 1860.

The Dubulti railway station was established in 1877. In 1951 Dubulti became the end station of the first ever electrified railway line in Latvian territory – Rīga-Dubulti. Electrification was then extended to Ķemeri station few years later.

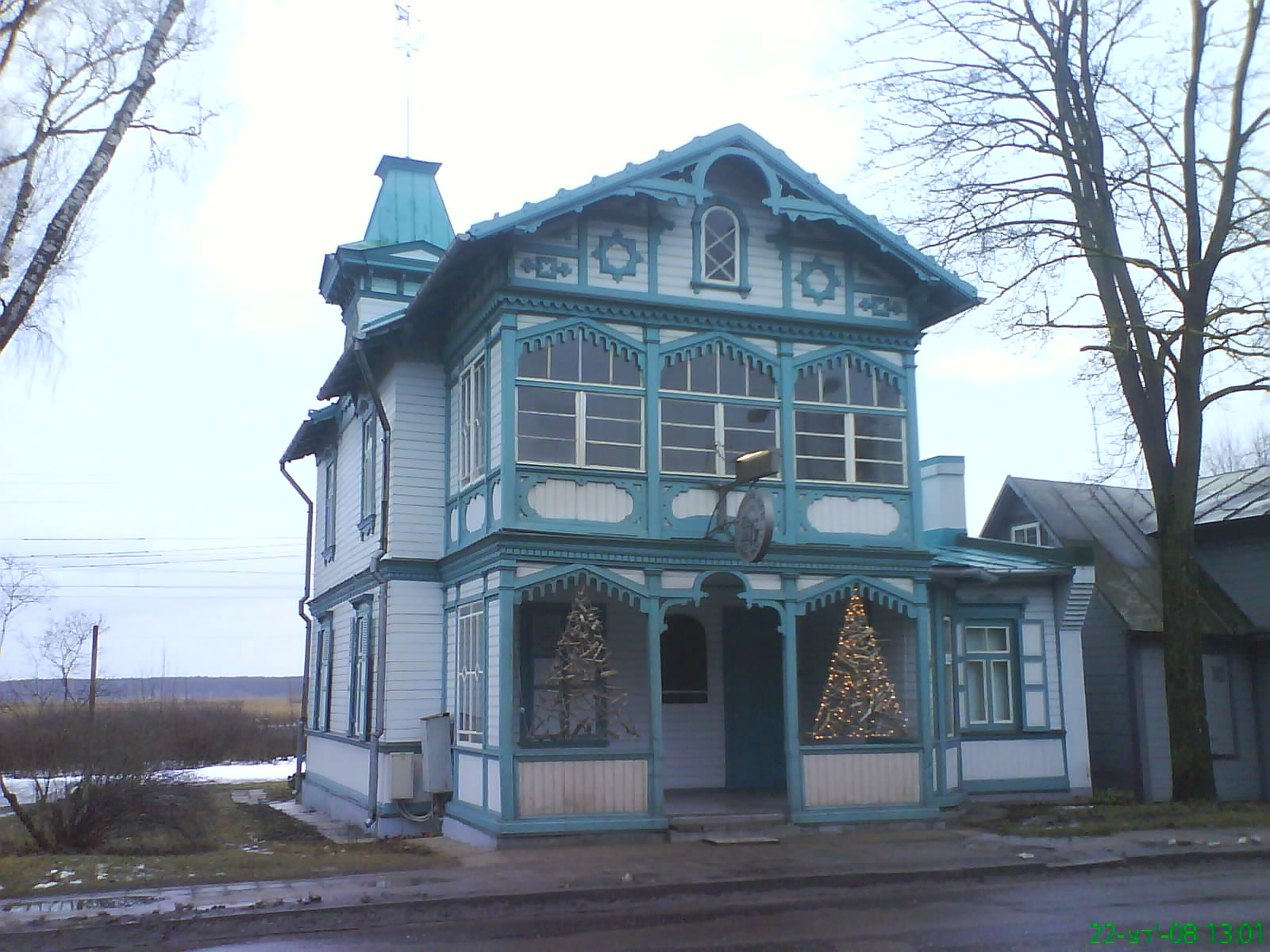
The poet Aspazija's home in Dubulti
