= Livu Akvaparks =

Water park in Jurmala, Latvia

Līvu Akvaparks
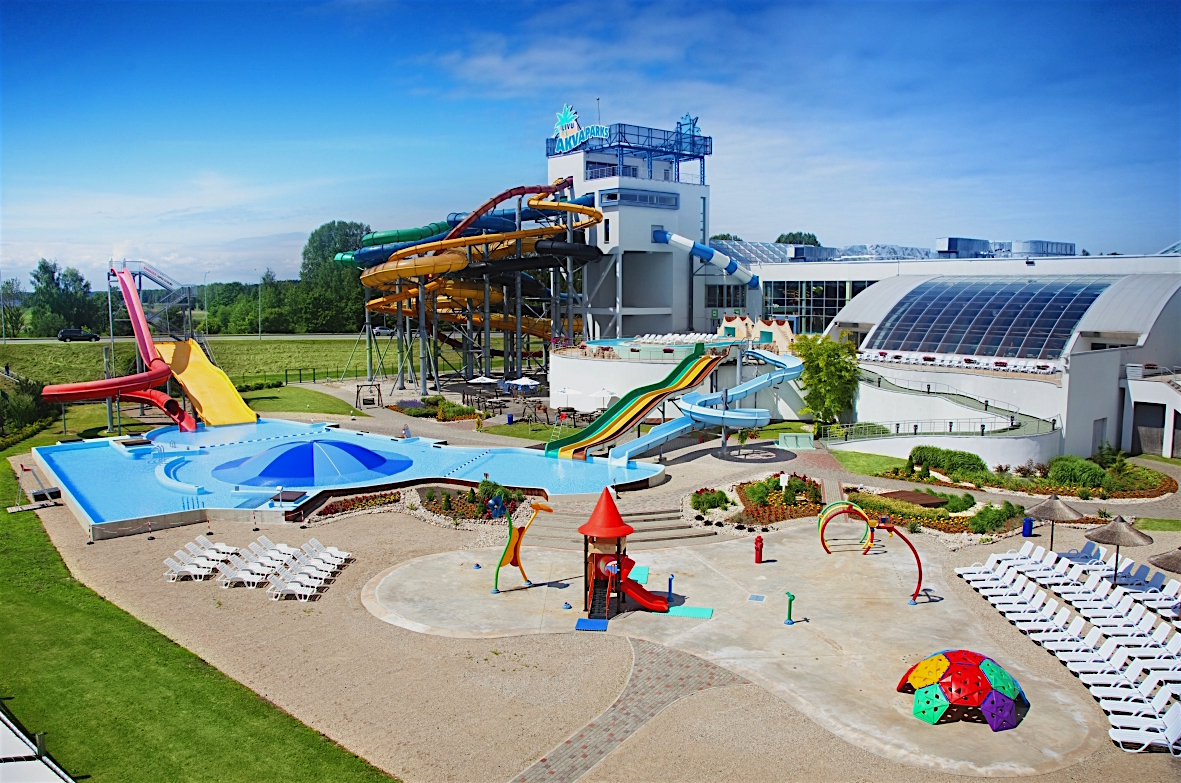
- Interactive map of Līvu Akvaparks
- Location: Jūrmala, Latvia
- Owner: SIA "Korporatīvā Sabiedrība" (majority shareholder)
- Opened: December 30, 2003; 22 years ago
- Operating season: All year round
- Visitors per annum: 300,000
- Area: 18,000 square metres (190,000 ft^{2})
- Website: www.akvaparks.lv/en/

Līvu Akvaparks (English: Līvu Aquapark) is the largest indoor multifunctional water park in the Baltic States and one of the biggest in Eastern Europe. The water park is one of Latvia's main tourist attractions. It is located in Jūrmala by the river Lielupe and it has more than 40 attractions, including about 20 water slides, more than 10 pools, including a wave pool, a children's area, an artificial stream, spa for adults with a cocktail bar, whirlpool, and saunas.

== History ==
Līvu Akvapark was opened on 30 December 2003, after two years of construction at a cost of €16 million. In early 2005 construction began on an outdoor water park and in the summer of the same year it was opened to the public. With the outdoor area, Līvu Akvapark's total space was expanded by 7,000 square metres (1.7 acres) bringing it to a total of 18,000 square metres (4.4 acres) making it the largest indoor water park in Northern Europe. In spring of 2007, the construction of a slide tower in the outdoor beach was started. Later, in 2008, an outdoor water fountain was added to celebrate the park's fifth anniversary. In 2012, it saw a complete reconstruction of the spa complex which added a salt chamber, four jacuzzis, a Turkish sauna, oxygen bath and more. In 2014, the outdoor pool was reconstructed and other attractions added. The outdoor pool has a capacity of 700 cubic metres (180,000 US gal), which is a quarter of the whole supply of water in the aqua park.

== Indoor attractions ==
Name (en)	Name (lv)	Length (m)	Boat	Notes
Black slide	Melnais slidkalniņš	100,7	Black boat	
Green slide	Zaļais slidkalniņš	108	Yellow boat	
Red slide	Sarkanais slidkalniņš	83,2	No boat	The speed is 70km/h, may be closed in causes of severe frost.
Orange slide	Oranžais slidkalniņš	135	No boat	
Yellow slide	Dzeltenais slidkalniņš	211,9	Yellow family boat	
Unique Tornado	Tornado	51,8	Light blue boat	
Silver Mine - Farm Frites	Sudraba raktuve	35	No boat	
