= Pēteris Pētersons =

Latvian playwright, theatre director and drama critic (1923–1998)

Pēteris Pētersons (1923–1998) was a Latvian playwright, theatre director and drama critic, theorist, translator, journalist and social activist. His debut play, Cilvēks oktobra vējā (A Man in the October Wind) came in 1947, and he began directing at the Theatre Institute in 1953. His production of Man trīsdesmit gadu (I’m Thirty Years Old) in 1962 was met with considerable acclaim. He also translated numerous plays and theoretical writings, especially from French.

From 1993 until his death he served as President of the Latvian Society and director of the Latvian Centre of the International Theatre Institute, and also served on the Riga City Council.

== Selected works ==
=== Directed and written plays ===
- I.Ziedoņa "Motocikls" (1967, Dailes teātris),
- F.Dostojevska "Idiots" (1969, Dailes teātris),
- A.Čaka "Spēlē, Spēlmani" (1972, Jaunatnes teātris),
- V.Majakovska "Mistērija par Cilvēku" (1973, Jaunatnes teātris),
- P.Pētersona "Bastards" (1978, Jaunatnes teātris),
- P.Pētersona "Meteors" (1987, Nacionālais teātris),
- P.Pētersona "Mirdzošais un tumši zilais" (1987, Dailes teātris),
- P.Pētersona "Fēlikss un Felicita" (1998, Nacionālais teātris).

=== Written works ===
- Balto torņu ēnā // Karogs, Nr. 8 (1959)
- Man trīsdesmit gadu // Karogs, Nr. 12 (1962)
- Darbības māksla. R.: Liesma (1978)
- Acis. Zvaigznes. Acis. Lugu un dzejas izlase. R.: Liesma (1983)
- Drāma kā kritērijs. R.: Liesma (1987)
- Meteors. Tikai muzikants. R.: Liesma (1988)
- Lugas. R.: Preses nams (1998)
