= Rada Lysenko =

Ukrainian pianist (1921–2021)

Rada Lysenko (Ukrainian: Рада Лисенко) (10 July 1921 – 11 January 2021) was a Ukrainian pianist, pedagogue, People's Artist of Ukraine recipient, and granddaughter of Mykola Lysenko.

== Career ==
She graduated from the Kyiv Conservatory after the war where Abram Lufer was her teacher. During the Second World War she was relocated to Germany from where she immigrated to Lviv. Later on, she was granted a residence in Moscow where she performed her popular concert called Vitry buini. She served on the jury at the International Music Competition since 1962 and at the age of 91 still performed and gave lessons at the same conservatory.
