= Sergei Lysenko (footballer, born 1972) =

Russian footballer

Personal information
- Full name: Sergei Mikhailovich Lysenko
- Date of birth: 24 August 1972 (age 54)
- Height: 1.89 m (6 ft 2 1/2 in)
- Positions: Defender; midfielder

Senior career*
Years	Team	Apps	(Gls)
1989	FC MTsOP Khimik Belorechensk	7	(0)
1990	FC Kuban Barannikovsky	21	(5)
1990–1999	FC Kuban Krasnodar	244	(8)
1999	FC Krasnodar (amateur)		
2000	FC Nemkom Krasnodar (amateur)		
2000	FC Alania Vladikavkaz	0	(0)
2000–2001	FC Kuban Krasnodar	29	(1)
2001	FC Vityaz Podolsk	14	(2)
2002	FC Vympel Krasnodar		
2003	FC Neftyanik Kubani Goryachy Klyuch		
2004	FC Spartak Semey	17	(0)
2006	FC Biolog Novokubansk (amateur)		
2006–2007	FC Azovets Primorsko-Akhtarsk		
2008	FC Trud Tikhoretsk		
- * Club domestic league appearances and goals

Sergei Mikhailovich Lysenko (Russian: Сергей Михайлович Лысенко; born 24 August 1972) is a former Russian football player.
