= Bulduri =

Neighbourhood of Jūrmala, Latvia

Coordinates: 56°59′00″N 23°51′22″E

Bulduri Bilderlingshof
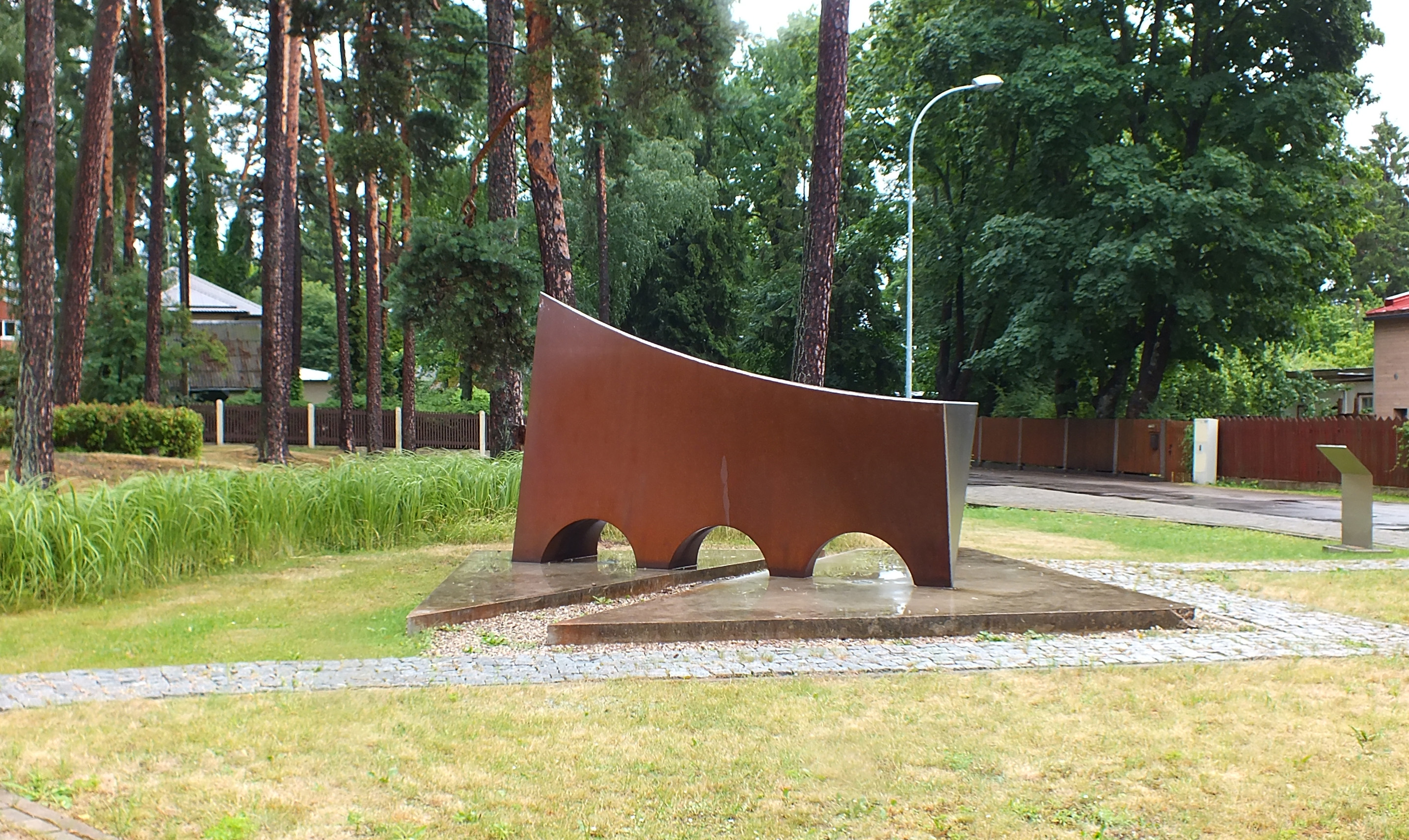
- Celebration of the Freedom Fights "The Bridge and Eternity"

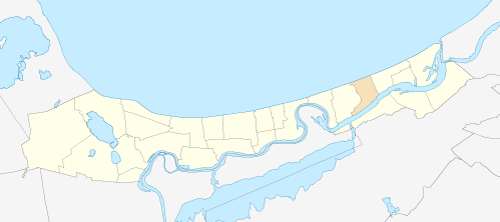
- Location in Jūrmala
- Country: Latvia
- City: Jūrmala

Area
  - Total: 2.7 km^{2} (1.0 sq mi)
- Elevation: 3 m (9.8 ft)

Population (2008)
  - Total: 3,070
  - Density: 1,137/km^{2} (2,940/sq mi)

Bulduri is a residential area and neighbourhood of the city of Jūrmala, Latvia.

The Bulduri railway station was established in 1877. During the era of Imperial Russia, Bulduri was known to Western visitors as Bilderlingshof (Bilderliņi in Latvian) Restaurant and nightclub Jūras Pērle (Sea Pearl) was built in Bulduri in 1965 according to plans by architect Josif Goldenberg and demolished in 1994.
