= Jūrmala =

State city in Vidzeme, Latvia

- State city
- Jūrmala State City
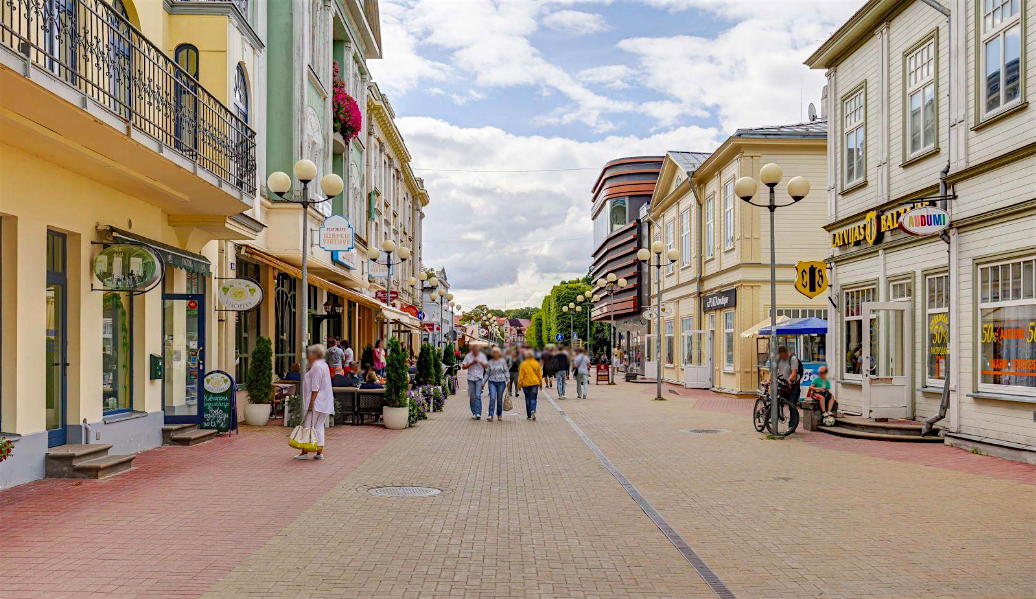
- Jomas Street

- Flag Coat of arms Brandmark

- Location of Jūrmala within Latvia
- Coordinates: 56°58′5″N 23°46′13″E
- Country: Latvia
- Town rights: 1959

Government
  - Mayor: Jānis Lediņš (Latvian Green Party)

Area
  - Total: 101.23 km^{2} (39.09 sq mi)
  - Land: 88.98 km^{2} (34.36 sq mi)
- Elevation: 6 m (20 ft)

Population (2026)
  - Total: 52,926
  - Density: 594.8/km^{2} (1,541/sq mi)

GDP
  - State city: 503,729,000 euro (2021)
  - Per capita: 10,002 euro (2021)
- Time zone: UTC+2 (EET)
  - Summer (DST): UTC+3 (EEST)
- Postal code: LV-2003; LV-2008; LV-20(10-17)
- Calling code: +371 67
- Number of city council members: 15
- Website: www.jurmala.lv

Jūrmala (Latvian: [ˈjuːrmala]; "seaside") is a state city in the Vidzeme region of Latvia, about 25 kilometres (16 miles) west of Riga. Jūrmala is a resort town stretching 32 km (20 miles) and is sandwiched between the Gulf of Riga and the Lielupe River. It has a 33 km (21 miles) stretch of white-sand beach and is the fifth-largest city in Latvia.

While Latvia was under Soviet occupation, Jūrmala was a favorite holiday-resort and tourist destination for high-level Communist Party officials, particularly Leonid Brezhnev and Nikita Khrushchev. Although many amenities such as beach-houses and concrete hotels remain, some have fallen into disrepair. Jūrmala remains a tourist attraction with long beaches facing the Gulf of Riga and romantic wooden houses in the Art Nouveau style.

== Names and administrative history ==
The name Jūrmala stems from Latvian jūra ("sea") and mala ("edge", "side", "margin"), thus "seaside" in English.

In 1920, soon after Latvian independence, the town of Rīgas Jūrmala ("Seaside of Riga") was established. In German, it became known as Rigasche Strand and Riga-Strand (Beach of Riga), and advertised as part of Baltische Riviera (the Baltic Riviera)

During World War II, Jūrmala lost its autonomy, and by 1946, it was a district of Riga. In 1949, this district was enlarged to include Priedaine. Finally, in 1959, the district of Jūrmala was removed from the city of Riga and merged with the health resorts Sloka and Ķemeri to establish Jūrmalas pilsēta (City of Jūrmala). In publications dating from the Soviet period, the city name was occasionally spelled in English as "Yurmala", a back-transliteration from Russian Юрмала.

As a result of the administrative territorial reform of Latvia in 2009, Jūrmala became one of the republican cities of Latvia (republikas pilsētas), and is currently (2011) the fifth largest by population. The republican cities were replaced with state cities (valstspilsētas) after the 2021 administrative reform, with Jūrmala becoming the Jūrmala State City (Jūrmalas valstspilsēta).

== History ==
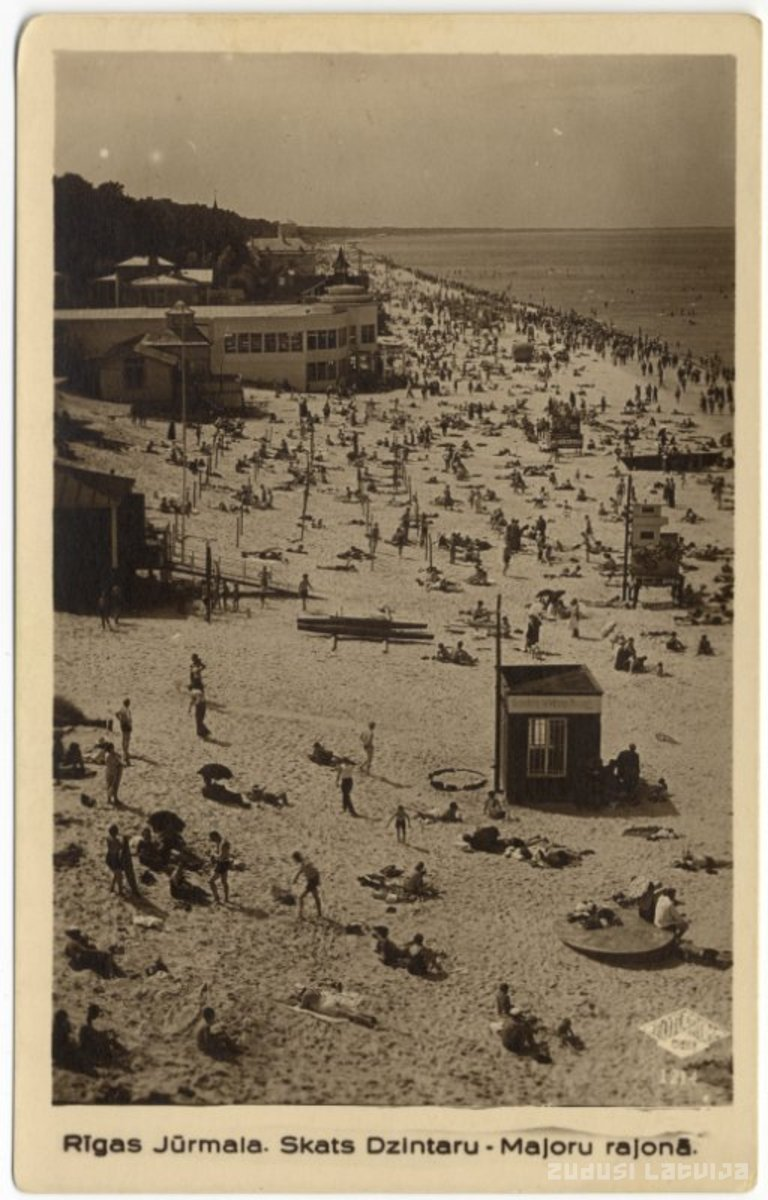
Vacationers in Jūrmala's beach in 1935

The city of Jūrmala actually consists of a string of small resorts. From west to east, these include Ķemeri, Jaunķemeri, Sloka, Kauguri, Vaivari, Asari, Melluži, Pumpuri, Jaundubulti, Dubulti, Majori, Dzintari, Bulduri and Lielupe and others.

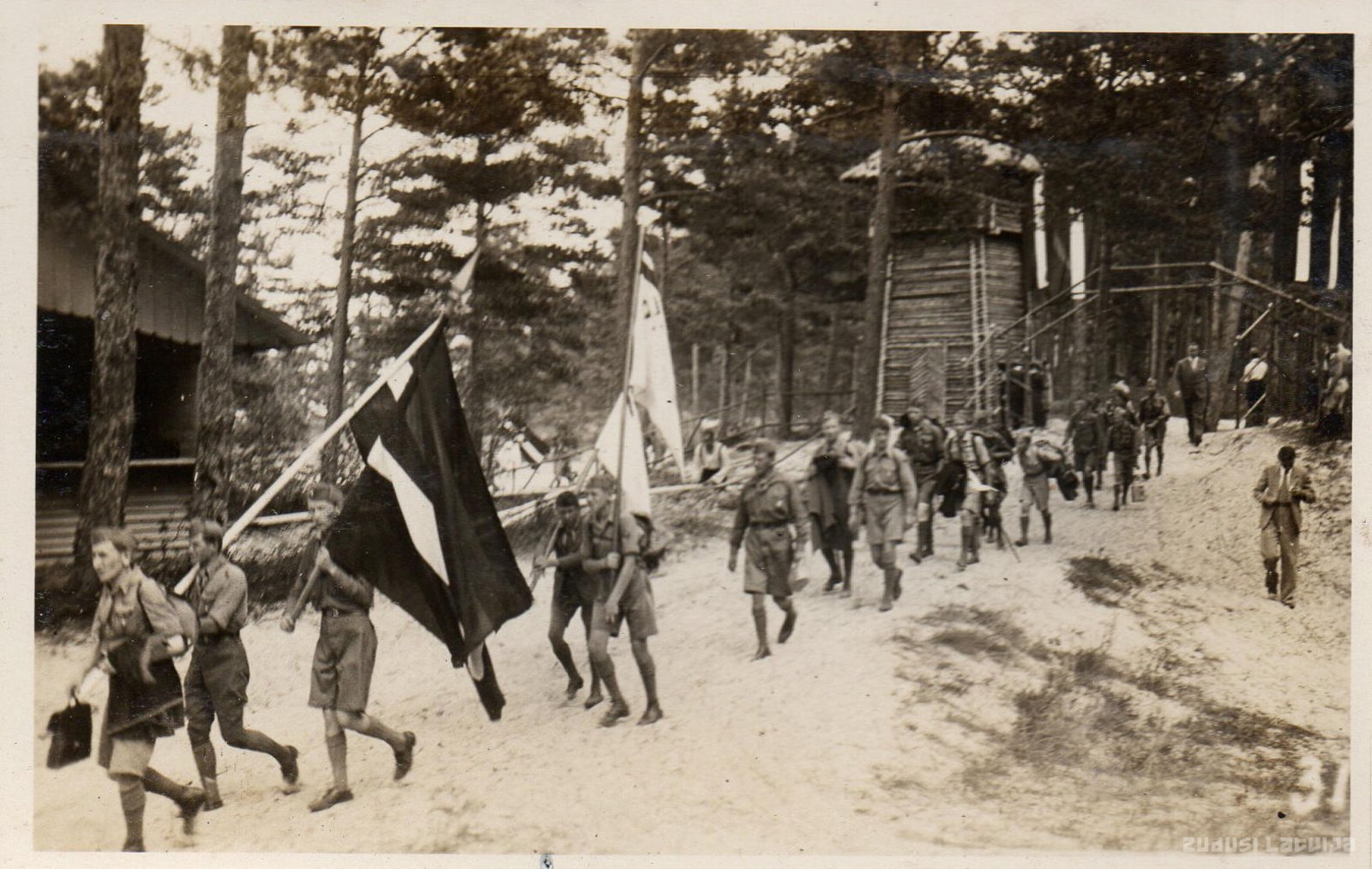
Members of the Latvian Scout and Guide Central Organization carrying flag of Latvia in Jūrmala in 1934

Jūrmala's reputation as a spa destination began in the late 18th and early 19th centuries. Wealthy landowners began the tradition of relaxing at the seaside, and Russian army officers came here to rest after the Napoleonic Wars, returning later with their families. The peak of the Jūrmala area's development was the opening of the Riga - Tukums railway in 1877 (which still passes through Jūrmala) that gave a great boost to the numbers of visitors, and thus a boost to the development of the town as a resort. Jūrmala also gained a reputation as a health spa. The sea breeze, pine aroma, mineral springs, and sandy beach encouraged many sanatoriums to develop within the city.

In Soviet times Jūrmala was popular with the Communist officials because of its beach and sanatoriums - holidays were also given as rewards for top union members. It became one of the most popular holiday destinations in the whole Union. The spas offered facilities from mud baths to riding therapy and hiking in the woods. In summer there are many concerts.

Whereas Riga has advanced rapidly to embrace and cater for growing numbers of Western tourists, Jūrmala has lagged behind. Russians are now subject to strict visa requirements and its beaches have yet to attract significant numbers of Europeans, leaving the tourist industry with a hard task on its hands. However, during the past few years, Jūrmala has started to recover. Many Russian celebrities, successful businessmen and others buy houses near the beach, and a variety of festivals and other activities attract increasing crowds each summer. At the moment, Jūrmala has almost resumed the popularity that it had with the Soviet elite.

The main beach at Majori and another at Bulduri now bear blue eco-flags signalling the sea is clean and safe to swim in, and the Latvian Academy of Sciences boasts a hotel for its members in the town. There is also the Midsummer Festival in June, celebrating the longest day of the year. The "Jaunais Vilnis" New Wave (competition) music festival showcases the latest music from all over Europe. The Lonely Planet guide to the region states that it is one of the highlights of Latvia.

== Jewish community ==
The Jewish community in Jūrmala (primarily in the districts of Bulduri, Dubulti, and Majori) began forming in the late 19th century. Initially, Jews were only permitted to reside in the area if they held elevated social status — such as first-guild merchants, discharged "Nicholas soldiers" (Jewish conscripts in the Tsarist army), or officially recognized "honorary citizens". Due to these restrictions, Jewish presence was limited, and Shabbat and holiday prayers were often held in private homes, sometimes in secrecy.

In 1904, an organized Jewish community was formally established in Bulduri. In 1906, the first synagogue was built under the initiative of Mordechai Lezhik, a Jewish shoemaker and military veteran, with the support of Jewish merchants from Riga. Over time, especially following Latvia's independence and the lifting of legal limitations, the Jewish population in Jūrmala expanded considerably. During the summer season, over 13,000 vacationers arrived, many of them Jewish. At least five synagogues were active in Bulduri and the coastal area, including an eastern-style synagogue constructed in Majori just three weeks before the outbreak of World War II.

The main synagogue in Bulduri was renovated and expanded, and on 14 August 1938, a new and architecturally significant building was inaugurated. It was designed by architect Boris Klavins and bore resemblance to the Great Synagogue in Tel Aviv. The ceremony was attended by rabbis, government representatives, and public figures including Riga's Chief Rabbi Michael Zak and community leader Mordechai Dubin.

On 21 July 1941, shortly after Nazi Germany's invasion of the Soviet Union, the Bulduri synagogue was set ablaze by Latvian nationalist collaborators while several people were inside — including caretaker Michelson, his wife, children, and another local resident. All were killed. The incident was witnessed and documented, notably by British citizen Lucy Addison who was present in Jūrmala at the time. This attack is considered one of the earliest cases in Latvia of a synagogue being burned with its occupants still inside — predating the mass atrocities in Riga.

In the 2000s, public initiatives were launched to create a memorial on the site of the destroyed synagogue. In 2012, the Jūrmala city council approved a plan to erect a monument designed by sculptor Māris Abilevs, and land was allocated for the project. However, the plan was never implemented due to financial constraints and disagreements over the location.

In August 2018, the synagogue Beit Israel was inaugurated in the Bulduri neighborhood by philanthropist Emmanuel Grinshpun. It is currently the only functioning synagogue in the city and the first to be established since World War II. The community's rabbi and chairman is Shimon Kutnovsky-Liak.

== Architecture ==
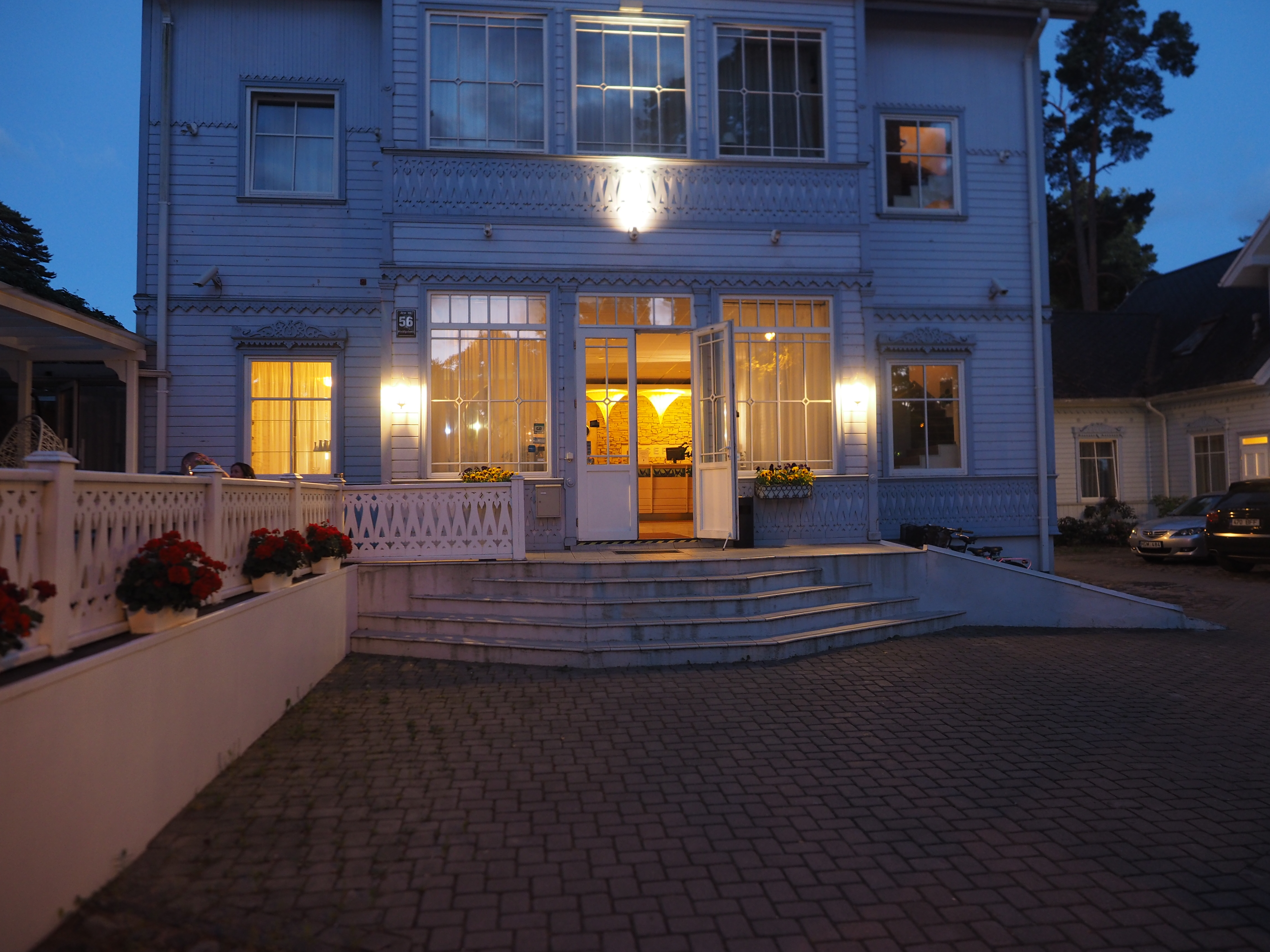
Jūrmala is famous for its wooden houses.

The most distinguishing architectural feature in Jūrmala is the prevalence of wooden houses dating from the 19th and first half of the 20th century. Most of the buildings were built by Baltic German and Latvian architects, but there are also works of Russian, Finnish and other architects. Jūrmala's architecture typically falls into classicism, national romanticism, and modern styles. The town has an official list of 414 historical buildings under protection, as well as over 4,000 wooden structures.. Dubulti Station is an example of sculptural concrete shell Modernist architecture.

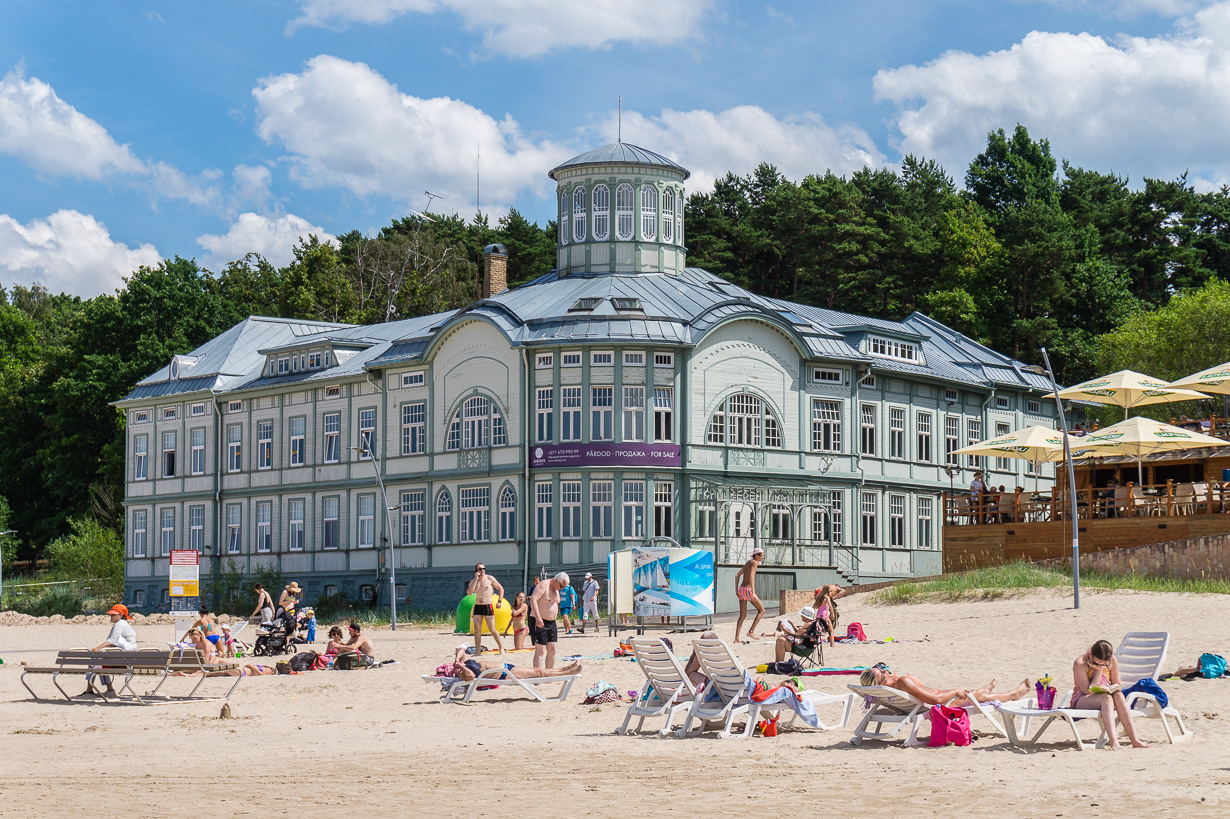
Former Swimming Establishment of Emīlija Rācene on the beach in Majori - The building was constructed at the beginning of the 20th century and saw its expansion in 1914. During Soviet times the building hosted resort clinics that were among the most well-arranged treatment establishments in Jurmala.

== Geography ==
=== Beach ===
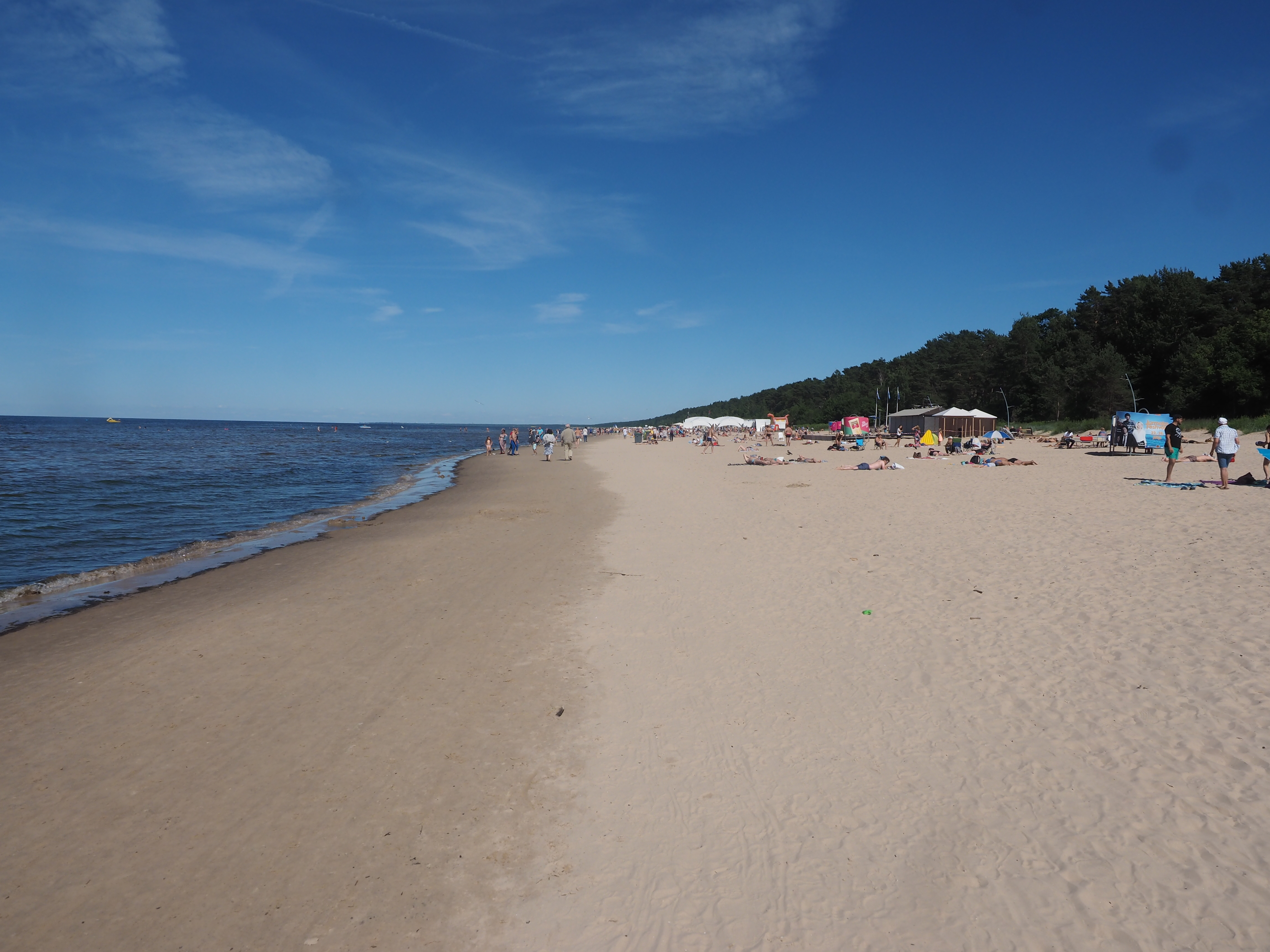
The beach in Jūrmala is very long and shallow

Jūrmala's beach is 33 km (21 mi) long, covered with white quartz sand. The shallow coastal waters are suitable and safe for children. The beach is equipped with playgrounds, small benches, football fields and volleyball courts, as well as descents for prams and wheelchairs. In spring and autumn amber pieces can be found on the beach.

Each region's beach has its own character. In Majori and Bulduri, where the Blue Flag flies, it is possible to rent water bicycles or relax in the beach cafe. In Dubulti and Dzintari competitions in beach football and volleyball take place, but on Pumpuri beach there is kite surfing and windsurfing.

International water sports contests, including rowing, sailing, and waterskiing that take place on the river Lielupe.

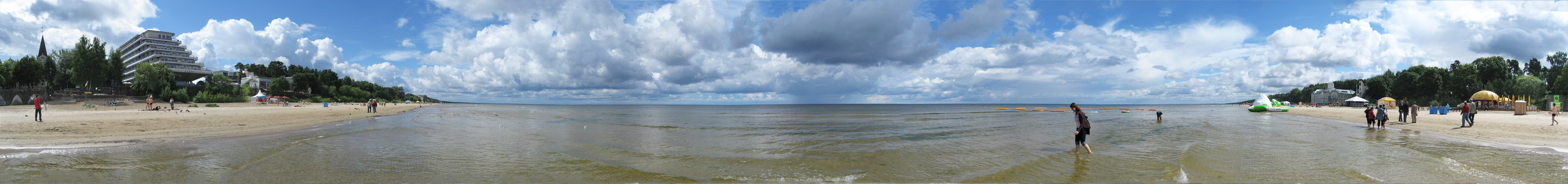
Panoramic View of the beach at Jūrmala

=== Climate ===
Jūrmala has an oceanic climate (Köppen Cfb) closely bordering on a humid continental climate (Köppen Dfb), because it is on the coast of the Baltic Sea.

Climate data for Jūrmala (1985–2015)
Month	Jan	Feb	Mar	Apr	May	Jun	Jul	Aug	Sep	Oct	Nov	Dec	Year
Mean daily maximum °F (°C)	32 (0)	33 (1)	40 (4)	52 (11)	62 (17)	69 (21)	74 (23)	71 (22)	62 (17)	51 (11)	41 (5)	34 (1)	52 (11)
Mean daily minimum °F (°C)	24 (−4)	23 (−5)	27 (−3)	35 (2)	43 (6)	51 (11)	56 (13)	55 (13)	47 (8)	39 (4)	33 (1)	26 (−3)	38 (4)
Average relative humidity (%)	88	85	80	72	70	73	75	77	81	85	89	89	80
Source: Time and date

== Tourist attractions ==
=== Līvu Akvaparks ===
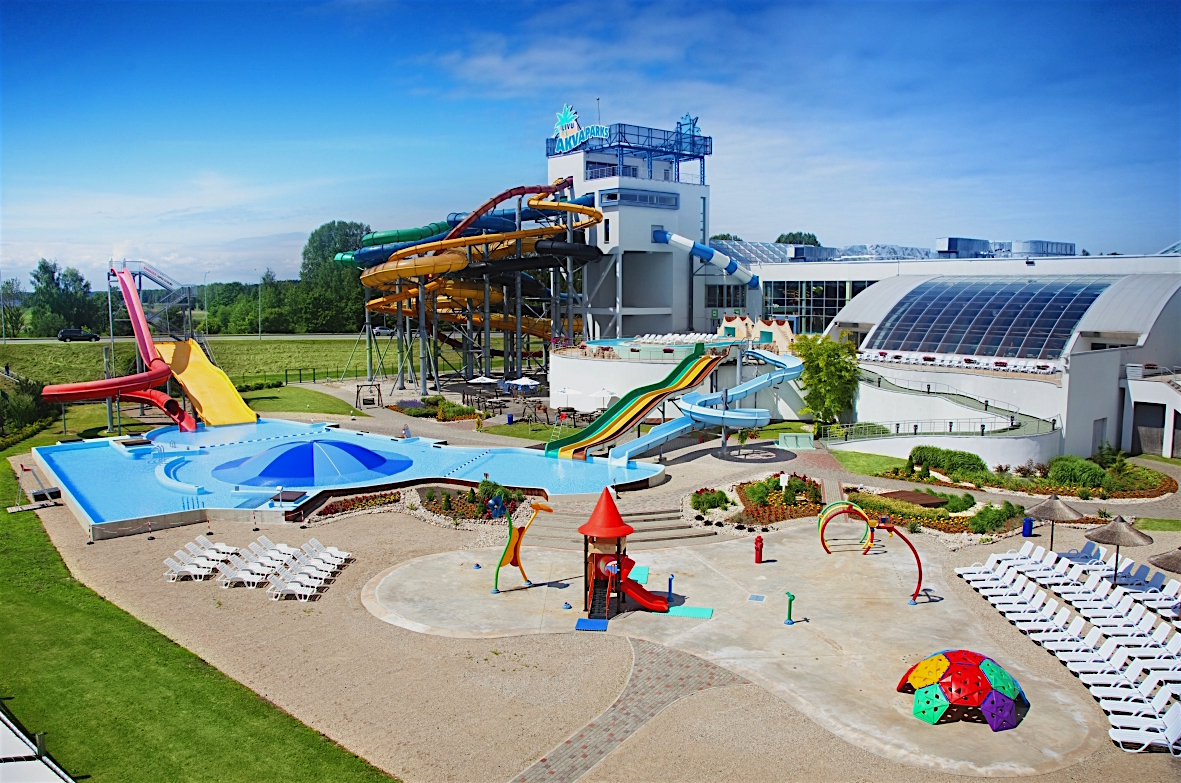
Livu Akvaparks, Jurmala

Līvu Akvaparks in Jūrmala is one of the largest water amusement parks in Northern Europe. The 3 floors of Līvu Akvaparks include more than 20 slides, more than 10 pools of various depths and sizes, attractions for children, a SPA complex with 4 saunas, cold pool, salt chamber, bubble baths and air and underwater massage facilities. The park's area is 11,000m^{2}, but in summers an additional 7 000m^{2} becomes available to visitors, bringing the total area to 18 000m^{2} making this the largest closed-type water park in Northern Europe that operates throughout the year. It opened for visitors on 30 December 2003, after almost 2 years of construction and at a cost of more than 16 million euros. Each year it receives 300,000 visitors, of which roughly 45% are Latvians.

=== Ķemeri National Park ===
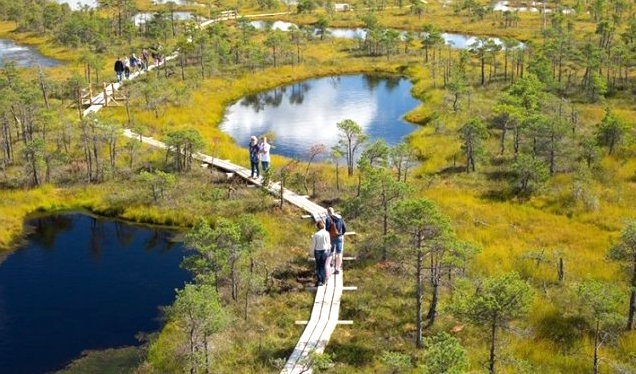
Ķemeri National Park

Ķemeri National Park (Latvian: Ķemeru nacionālais parks) is a national park west of the city of Jūrmala, Latvia. Established in 1997, Ķemeri is the third largest national park in the country by area, covering an area of 381.65 km^{2}. The territory of the park is mostly occupied by forests and mires, the most significant of them being The Great Ķemeri Bog (Latvian: Lielais Ķemeru tīrelis). The Great Kemeri Bog Boardwalk is a popular tourist destination in Ķemeri National Park, Latvia, offering visitors a chance to explore the bog and its inhabitants. A small boardwalk arc (1.4 km) and a great boardwalk arc (3.4 km) is present, with an observation platform that is a popular place with photographers for sunrise and sunset scenes in Latvia, regardless of the season or weather.

=== Jomas Street ===
Jomas street (Latvian: Jomas iela) is one of the central and oldest streets of Jūrmala, which during its existence has undergone various changes and transformations. Most of the street is a walking boulevard closed to vehicle traffic, and is populated with restaurants, bars, souvenir booths, fruit stalls and a small shopping complex containing a cinema.

=== Dzintari Forest Park ===
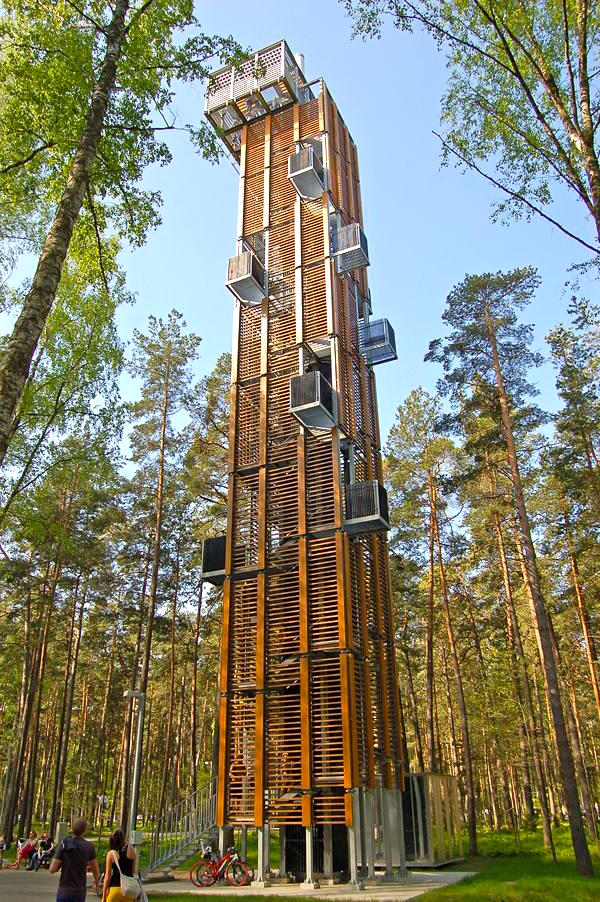
Dzintari Watchtower

The Dzintari Forest Park (Latvian: Dzintaru Mežaparks) is located near the centre of Jūrmala, with 200 year old pine groves surrounding the park. For leisure there are walkways that weave within the park connecting a skate park, 3 children playgrounds, a cafe, a roller-skate path (with skiing available in winter), basketball courts and a free-to-enter watchtower.

The Dzintari watchtower at 33.5 meters high, soars past the pine trees with a large viewing platform at the top allowing tall distant objects to be seen such as the Riga Radio and TV Tower. Throughout the entire height of the watchtower a total of 12 platforms are formed, overlooking all directions.

It also includes a paid obstacle course in the trees with 5 routes and a 250m zip line.

=== Jūrmala Open Air Museum and Ragakapa Nature Park ===
Jūrmala Open Air Museum (Latvian: Jūrmalas brīvdabas muzejs) located east of Bulduri celebrates the cities fishing heritage. A fisherman's court has been set up, and its nearly 2,000 exhibits portray the fishermen's work and life in Jūrmala in the 19th and 20th centuries. Nearby Ragakāpa Nature Park (Latvian: Ragakāpas dabas parks), this is a natural 800 m long and 100 m wide dune formed out of wind-activity, with viewing platforms and an eco-trail present.

=== Lielupe ===
The 116 km long river Lielupe flows within Jūrmala. It is popular amongst canoeists and kayakers as Lielupe flows through and connects populated municipalities including Bauska, Mežotne, Jelgava, Kalnciems and Riga. In addition waterskiing, fishing, boat cruising and taking summer ferry trips are popular.

=== Ķemeri Sanatorium ===
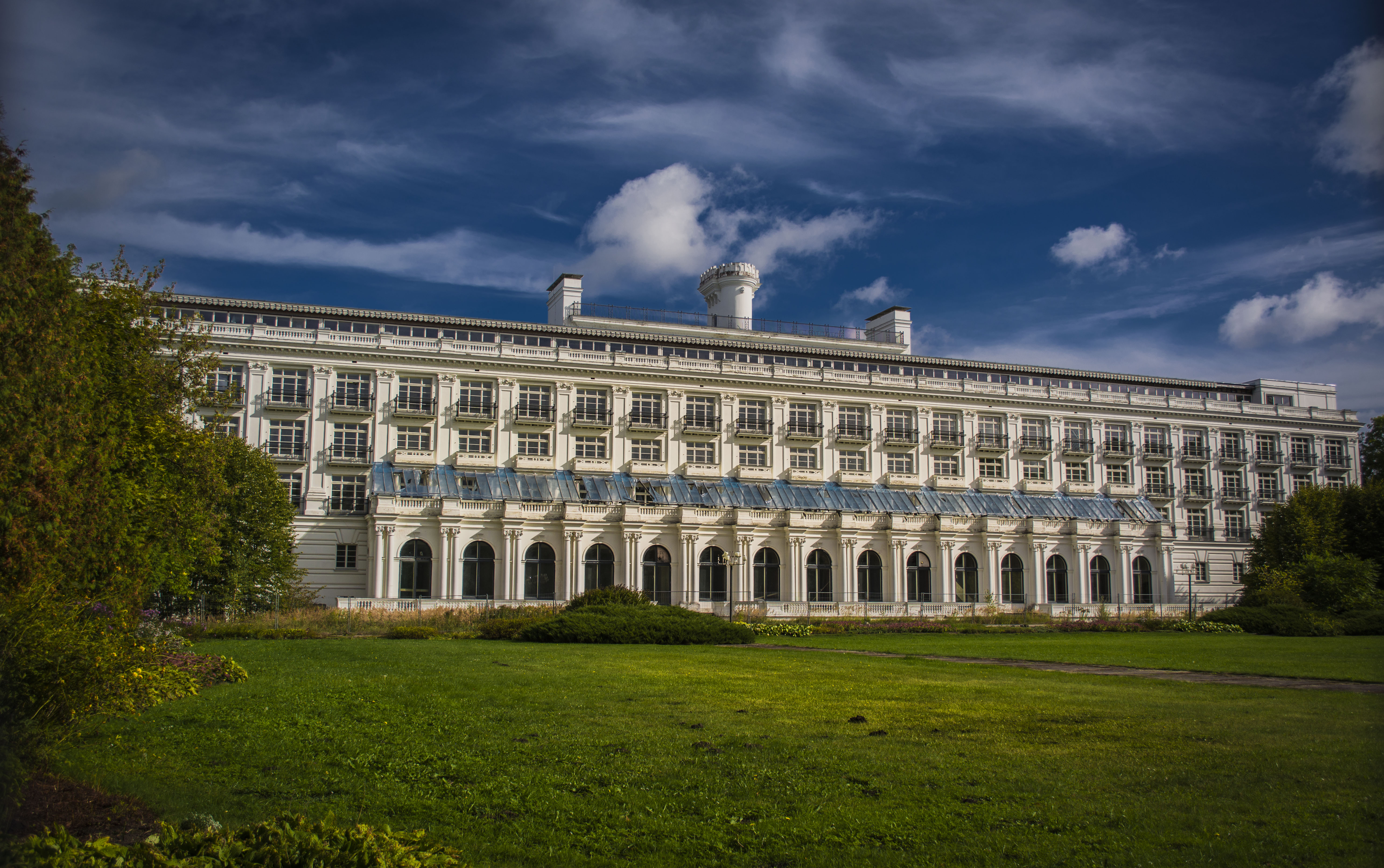
Ķemeri Hotel (Sanatorium) Building

Ķemeri hotel (sanatorium) building (Latvian: Ķemeru viesnīca (sanatorija)) is one of the most prominent neo-attraction examples in Latvian architecture. In 1936, President Kārlis Ulmanis officially opened one of the most prestigious buildings in Latvia at the time, Hotel "Ķemeri" with 100 comfortable rooms and a luxurious hall. The building was designed by Latvian architect Eižens Laube and was built by public funds.

After World War II, it was transformed into a sanatorium with 300 beds for treating problems with nervous systems, as well as patients with joint, bones and musculoskeletal and gynaecological diseases from the Soviet republics with a very wide range of health resorts and medical services. After the restoration of Latvia's independence, the building was privatised and its reconstruction started, but the project has been largely unsuccessful and reconstruction has still not been completed.

== Sports events and clubs ==
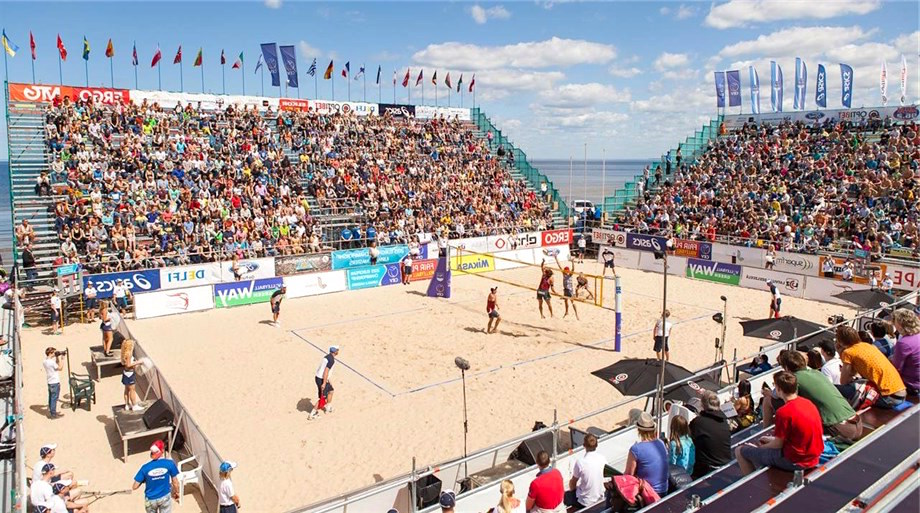
2017 European Beach Volleyball Championships

The 2017 European Beach Volleyball Championships was held from August 16 to August 20, 2017. The draw consisted of 32 men's & 32 women's teams, with 100,000 EUR prize money per gender. The best Latvian men's team of Aleksandrs Samoilovs and Jānis Šmēdiņš took home silver, losing 2–0 to Italy in the finals. The best Latvian's women's team of Tina Graudina and Anastasija Kravcenoka lost in the quarterfinals to Germany 2–0. A 2,800 stadium was purpose built on Majori beach, with near capacity for most games.

The 2012 Winter Swimming World Championships were hosted in Jūrmala in January with a then-record 1,129 participants attending. This made Latvia the 3rd international host since its inception in 2000 at Helsinki, Finland.

FK Spartaks is a Latvian football club in Jūrmala that plays its home matches in the 2,500 capacity Sloka Stadium. They won the Latvian Higher League football premiership in 2016 and 2017.

The Baltic Open tennis tournament, which is part of the WTA Tour, is held at the National Tennis Center Lielupe in Jūrmala in July, starting in 2019.

== Notable people ==
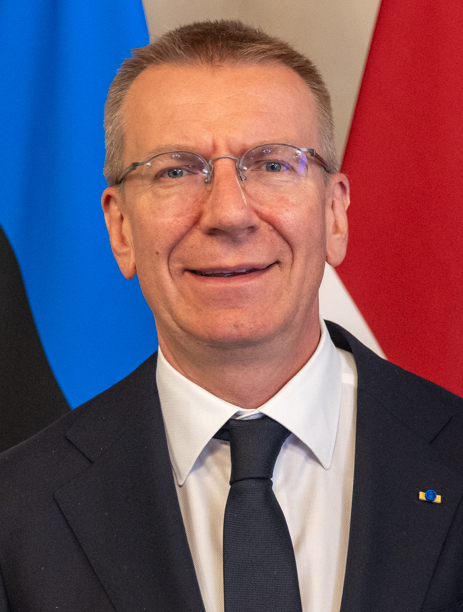
Edgars Rinkēvičs, 2026

The following people were born in Jūrmala:

- Heinrichs Skuja (1892–1972), phycologist and protistologist, he studied algae
- Pēteris Pētersons (1923–1998), playwright, theatre director and drama critic.
- Imants Ziedonis (1933–2013), poet and writer
- Andris Kolbergs (1938–2021), writer, he won the Annual Latvian Literature Award in 2011
- Mikhail Zadornov (1948–2017), a Soviet and Russian stand-up comedian and writer.
- Amanda Aizpuriete (1956–2023), poet and translator
- Aleksandr Kaleri (born 1956), former cosmonaut and veteran of extended stays on the Mir Space Station
- Andris Ameriks (born 1961), politician and economist, MEP since 2019 and former deputy mayor of Riga.
- Dzintars Rasnačs (born 1963), politician, Minister of Justice, 1995 to 1998 and 2014 to 2019
- Artis Pabriks (born 1966), politician, Minister for Defence and Deputy Prime Minister of Latvia. since 2019.
- Didzis Gavars (born 1966), politician, Minister of Health of Latvia, in 2010.
- Otto Ozols (born 1970), writer, pen name of Mārtiņš Barkovskis, columnist, writer and social activist.
- Ints Dālderis (born 1971), clarinetist and politician, Minister of Culture of Latvia, 2009 to 2010
- Edgars Rinkēvičs (born 1973), politician, President of Latvia since 2023
- Ilze Jaunalksne (born 1976), journalist and TV anchor
- Daniels Pavļuts (born 1976), politician, Minister for Economics of Latvia, from 2011 until 2014.
- Vestards Šimkus (born 1984), pianist, composer and improviser
- Kārlis Bardelis (1985–2025), an adventurer and world traveler using human-powered expeditions – like rowing across oceans
- Māra Lisenko (born 1986), singer-songwriter, founded the band Karmafree in London in 2010

=== Sport ===
- Jānis Ozols (born 1972), bobsledder, competed at the 1998, 2002 and the 2006 Winter Olympics
- Elvis Mihailenko (born 1976), boxer, first Latvian National boxing champion
- Zane Eglīte (born 1984), women's basketball player, competed with the team at the 2008 Summer Olympics
- Vitālijs Smirnovs (born 1986), footballer who has played 230 games and 7 for Latvia
- Daniils Turkovs (born 1988), footballer who played 170 games and 4 for Latvia
- Ernests Gulbis (born 1988), tennis player, ranked world No. 10 by the ATP in 2014
- Oskars Muižnieks (born 1989). biathlete and mountain biker, competed in the 2018 Winter Olympics
- Roberts Bukarts (born 1990), ice hockey player
- Rihards Bukarts (born 1995), ice hockey player
- Artūrs Strautiņš (born 1998), basketball player
- Artūrs Žagars (born 2000), basketball player
- Jelizaveta Polstjanaja (born 2003), rhythmic gymnast, Latvian national champion.

== Festivals ==
During the Soviet era, Jūrmala was a venue for various festivals, including the pop music festival "Jūrmala" (1986–1993).

From 2001 onwards Jūrmala hosted the "New Wave" competition for young pop singers from all over Europe. Due to a ban of several Russian media personalities from entering Latvia, both competitions were moved from Jūrmala in 2015.

Since 2015, the international music festival Rendezvous, organized by Laima Vaikule, has been taking place in the Dzintari concert hall in Jurmala. Over the years, the festival was attended by Chris Norman, Londonbeat, Tanita Tikaram, Måns Zelmerlöw, Nemo, Patrisha, Uku Suviste, Tomas Nevergreen, Michał Szpak, Inese Galante, Noa, Vera Brezhneva, Bi-2, Mashina Vremeni, Manizha and other performers from Europe, Asia and America, the guest of the festival was Alla Pugacheva.

The Jūrmala International Piano Competition, arranged by the City Council and the Latvian Piano Teachers Association in collaboration with the Ministry of Culture of Latvia, for pianists of all nationalities aged 19 years and under, was established in 1994 and is held every two years in the "Dzintari" concert hall. As the International Academic Music Competition (with various categories), it reached its 11th Season in 2010.

== Transport ==
=== Railway ===
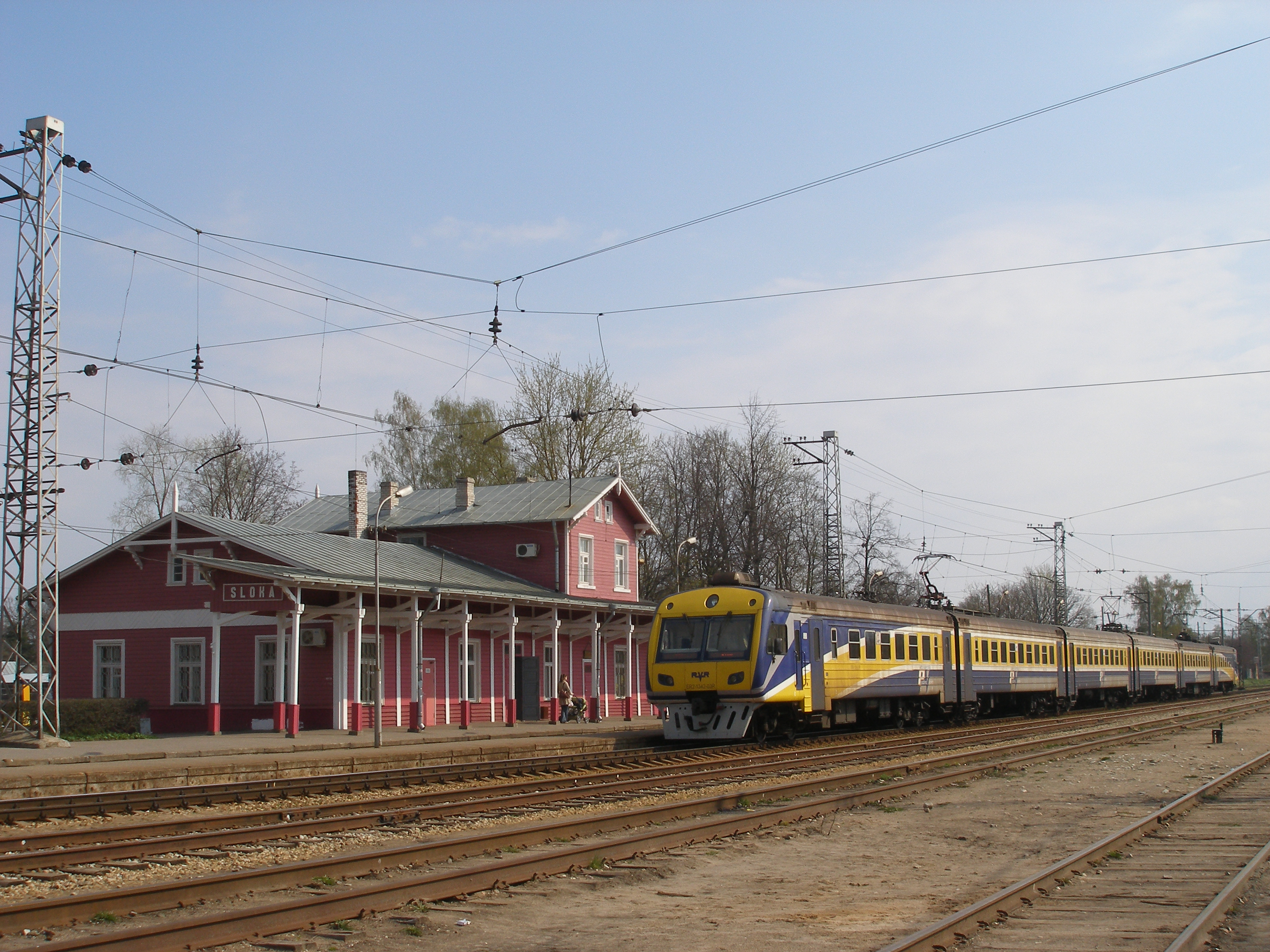
Refurbished ER2-1342 electric trainset in the Sloka Railway Station

The railway Riga-Tukums was built in 1875–1877. The route chosen included the narrow isthmus between Lielupe and the Gulf of Riga. A stretch of 13 km of the line runs within a kilometre of the sea, and there are ten stations within easy walking distance from the beach. This was a big boost to the development of Jūrmala as a series of resorts along the coast. In 1912 a direct train connection was established with Moscow. The railway through Jūrmala is currently double-track and electrified. The current railway stations in Jūrmala, sorted from east to west, are Priedaine, Lielupe, Bulduri, Dzintari, Majori, Dubulti, Jaundubulti, Pumpuri, Melluži, Asari, Vaivari, Sloka and Ķemeri.

=== Roads ===
A six lane road, designated A10 and E22, connects Riga to Jūrmala. A road toll is required from non-residents to pass the 4-lane bridge over Lielupe (built in 1962) and drive into Jūrmala. A railway overpass was built at Dzintari Station in 1976, giving a fast four-lane traffic flow into central Jūrmala.

=== Air ===
Riga International Airport is only 18 km from central Jūrmala (Majori). Confusingly, Jūrmala Airport, a former Soviet air base, is further away (39 km) from central Jūrmala, near Tukums.

== Demographics ==
As of 1 January 2019, the city had a population of 49,325.

Ethnic Groups Jūrmala (2017)
Latvians	48.5%
Russians	36.5%
Belarusians	3.6%
Ukrainians	2.6%
Poles	1.5%
Others	7.2%

== Mayor ==
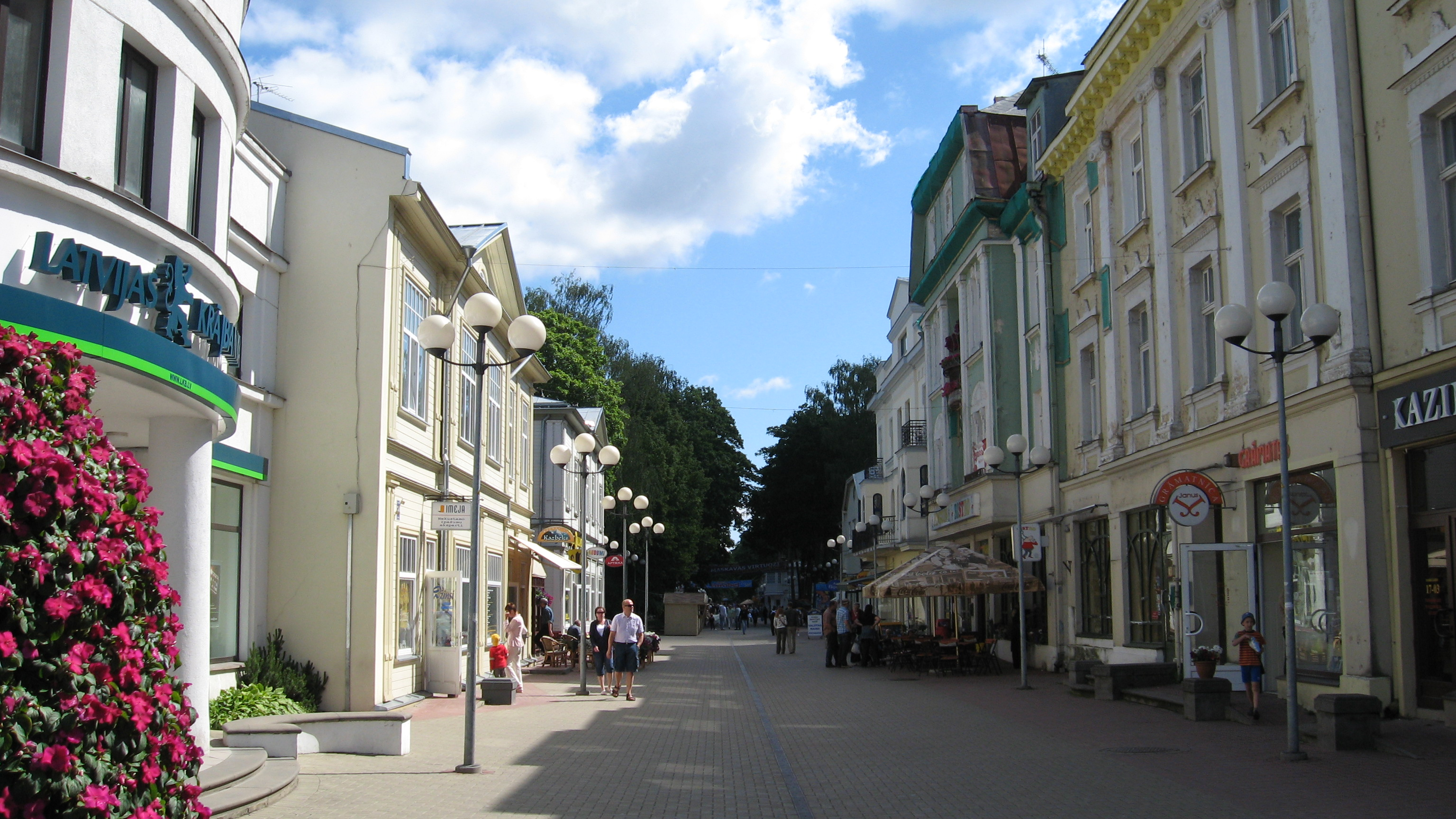
Jomas Street in Jūrmala

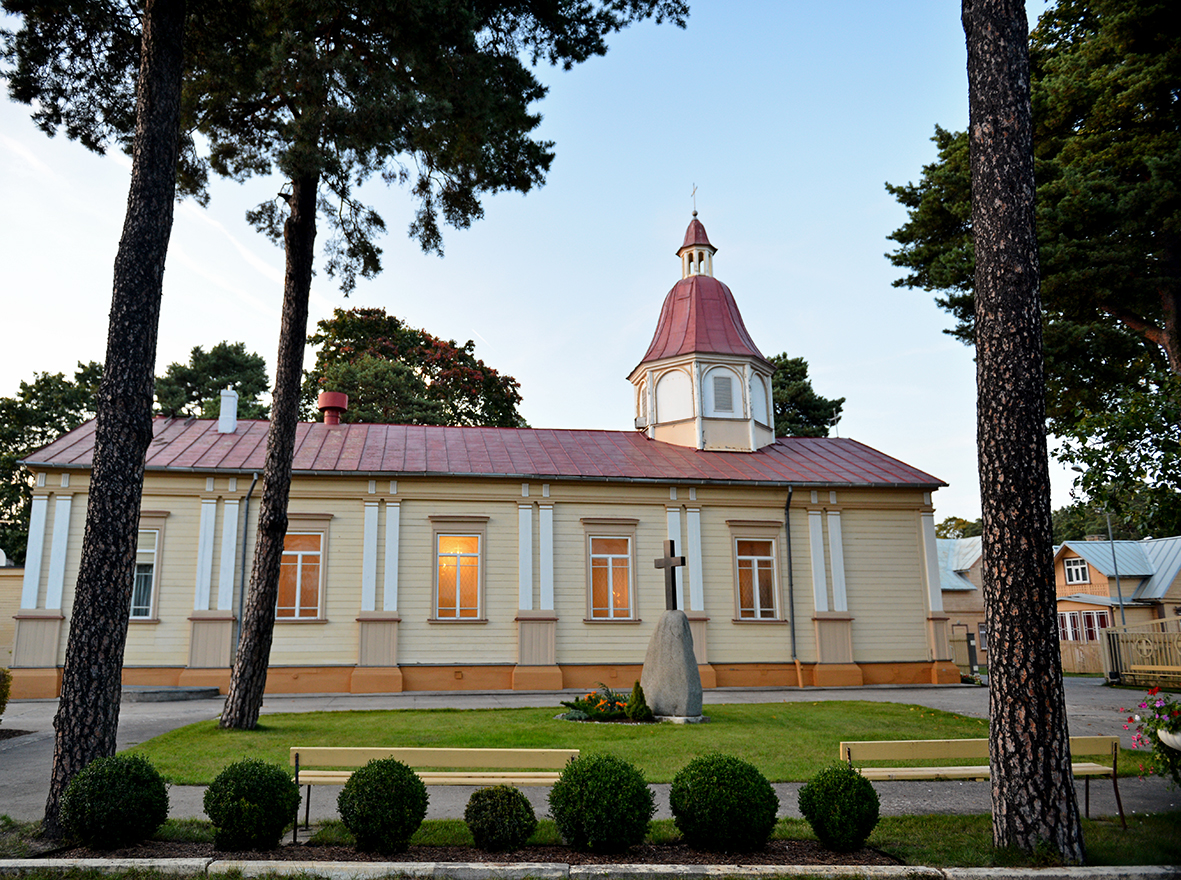
Roman Catholic church in Majori

- Rihards Pētersons (1991)
- Ligita Začesta (1991–1994)
- Andrejs Inkulis (1994–1997)
- Leonīds Alksnis (1997–2001)
- Dainis Urbanovičs (2001–2003)
- Juris Hlevickis (2003–2005)
- Inese Aizstrauta (2005–2006)
- Raimonds Munkevics (I term) (2006–2008)
- Ģirts Trencis (2008–2009)
- Raimonds Munkevics (II term) (2009–2010)
- Romualds Ražuks (2010)
- Gatis Truksnis (I term) (2010–2013)
- Juris Visockis (2013)
- Gatis Truksnis (II term) (2013–2016)
- Rita Sproģe (acting) (2016)
- Gatis Truksnis (III term) (2016–2017)
- Rita Sproģe (2017)
- Gatis Truksnis (IV term) (2017–2022)
- Rita Sproģe (2022-present)

== Twin towns – sister cities ==
Jūrmala is twinned with:

- Admiralteysky District (Saint Petersburg), Russia
- Alushta, Ukraine
- Anadia, Portugal
- (Georgia (country)) Anaklia, Georgia
- Ashdod, Israel
- Cabourg, France
- Eskilstuna, Sweden
- Gävle, Sweden
- Jakobstad, Finland
- Jilin, China
- Kazan, Russia
- Khanty-Mansiysk, Russia
- Palanga, Lithuania
- Pärnu, Estonia
- Samarkand, Uzbekistan
- Shenyang, China
- South-Western Administrative Okrug (Moscow), Russia
- Terracina, Italy
- (Georgia (country)) Tsqaltubo, Georgia
- Türkmenbaşy, Turkmenistan
