= Torņakalns–Tukums II Railway =

Railway line in Latvia

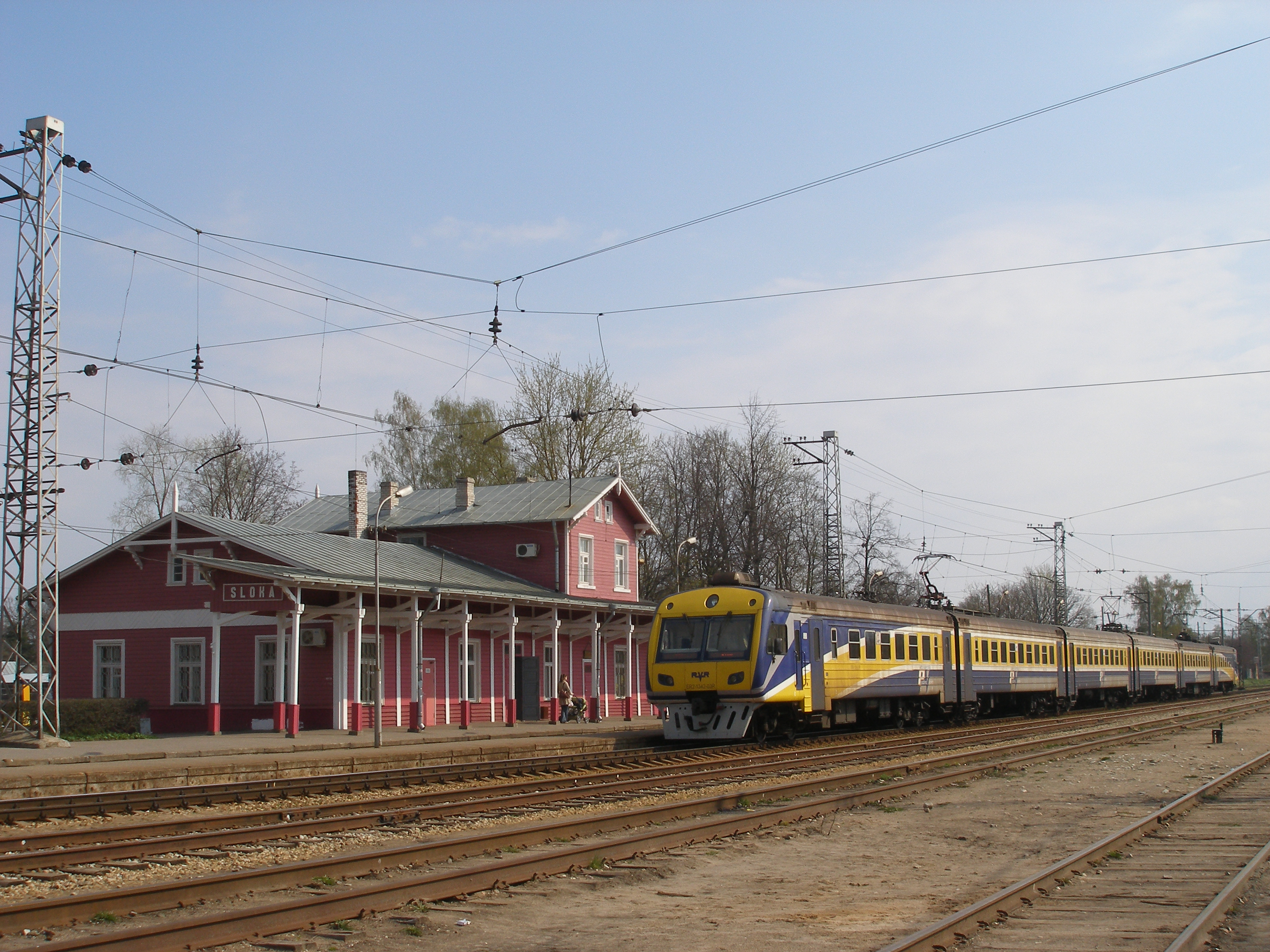
- Torņakalns–Tukums II Railway

Overview
- Termini: Torņakalns Station; Tukums II Station

Service
- Operator(s): Latvian Railways

History
- Opened: September 21, 1877

Technical
- Line length: 65 km (40.39 mi)
- Track gauge: 1,520 mm (4 ft 11 27/32 in) Russian gauge

Torņakalns–Tukums II Railway is a 65 kilometres (40 mi) long, 1,520 mm (4 ft 11 27/32 in) gauge railway in Latvia, built in the 19th century to connect Riga and Tukums, via the resort town of Jūrmala.

== See also ==
Railway lines in Latvia in 2016.

- Rail transport in Latvia
- History of rail transport in Latvia

== Bibliography ==
- Altbergs, T.; Augustāne, K.; Pētersone, I. (2009). Dzelzceļi Latvijā [Railways in Latvia] (in Latvian). Jumava. ISBN 978-9984-38-698-0.
