= Līvbērze Station =

Railway station in Latvia

Līvbērze
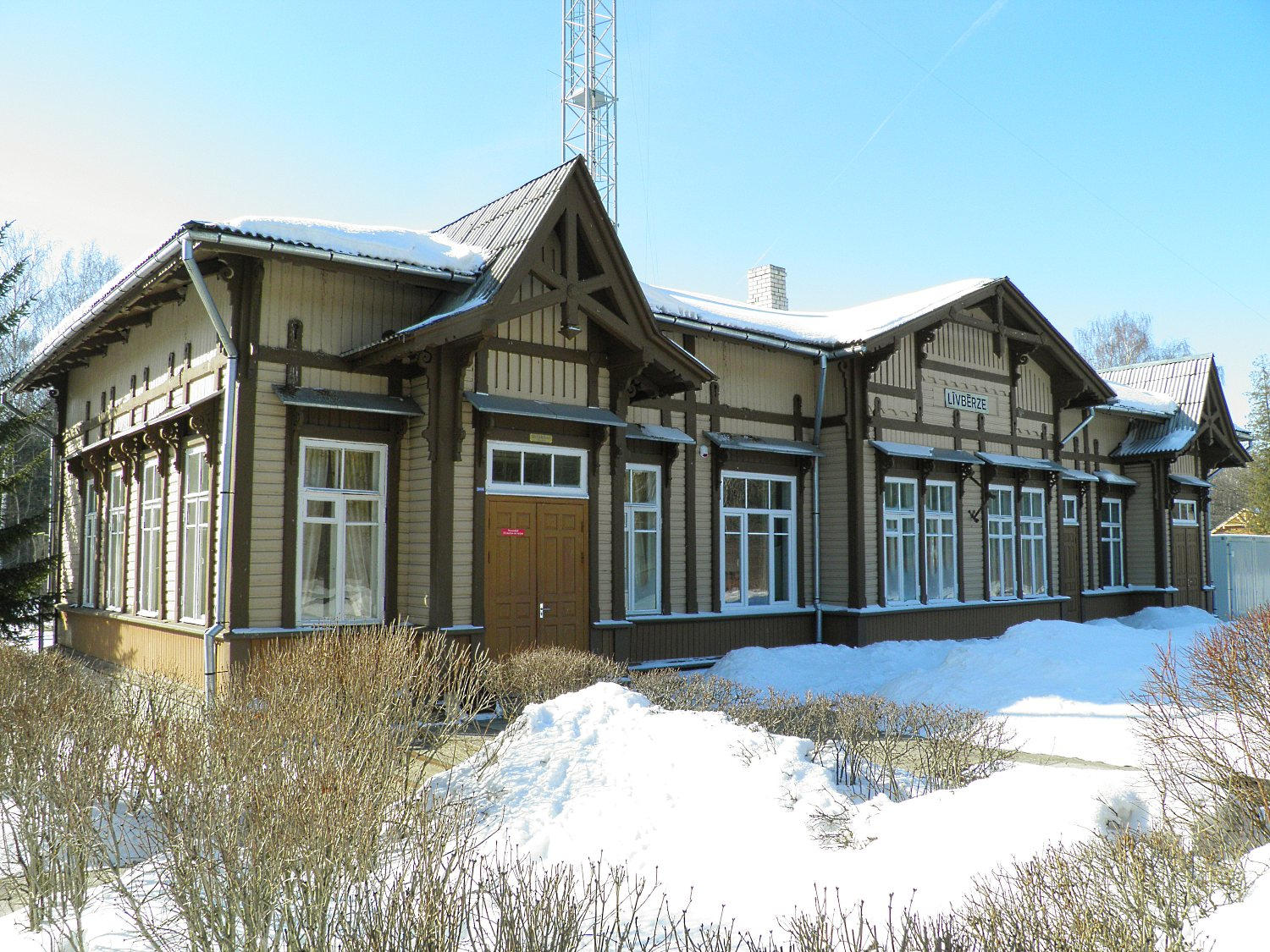

General information
- Coordinates: 56°42′8.87″N 23°27′51.02″E

Services
Preceding station	LDz	Following station
Apšupe towards Tukums II	Tukums II – Jelgava	Brakšķi towards Jelgava
Location

Līvbērze Station is a railway station on the Tukums II – Jelgava Railway.
