= Brakšķi Station =

Railway station in Latvia

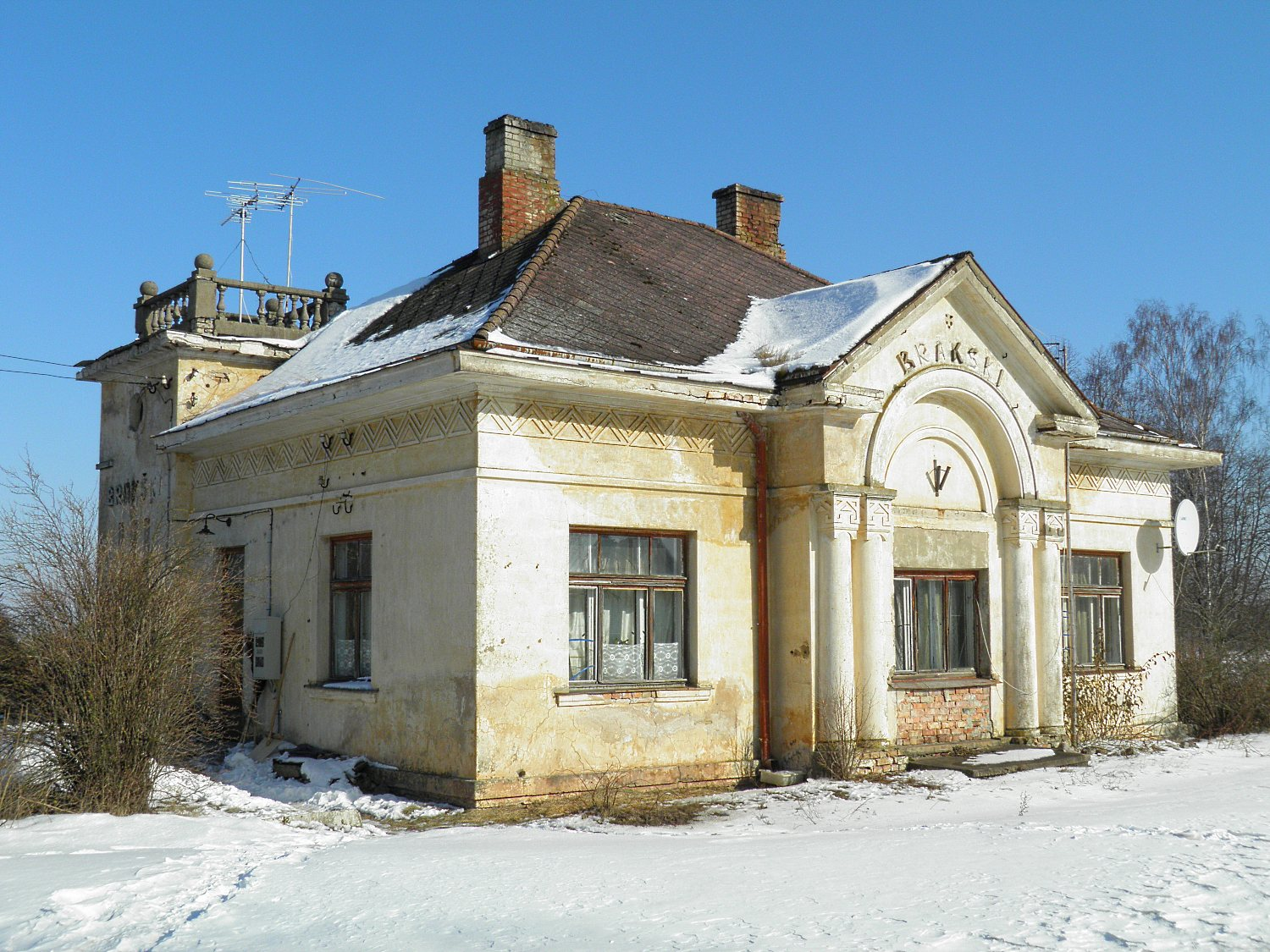

General information
- Coordinates: 56°39′40.36″N 23°32′19.07″E

Services
Preceding station	LDz	Following station
Līvbērze towards Tukums II	Tukums II – Jelgava	Jelgava Terminus
Location

Brakšķi Station is a railway station on the Tukums II – Jelgava Railway.
