= Apšupe Station =

Railway station in Latvia

Apšupe
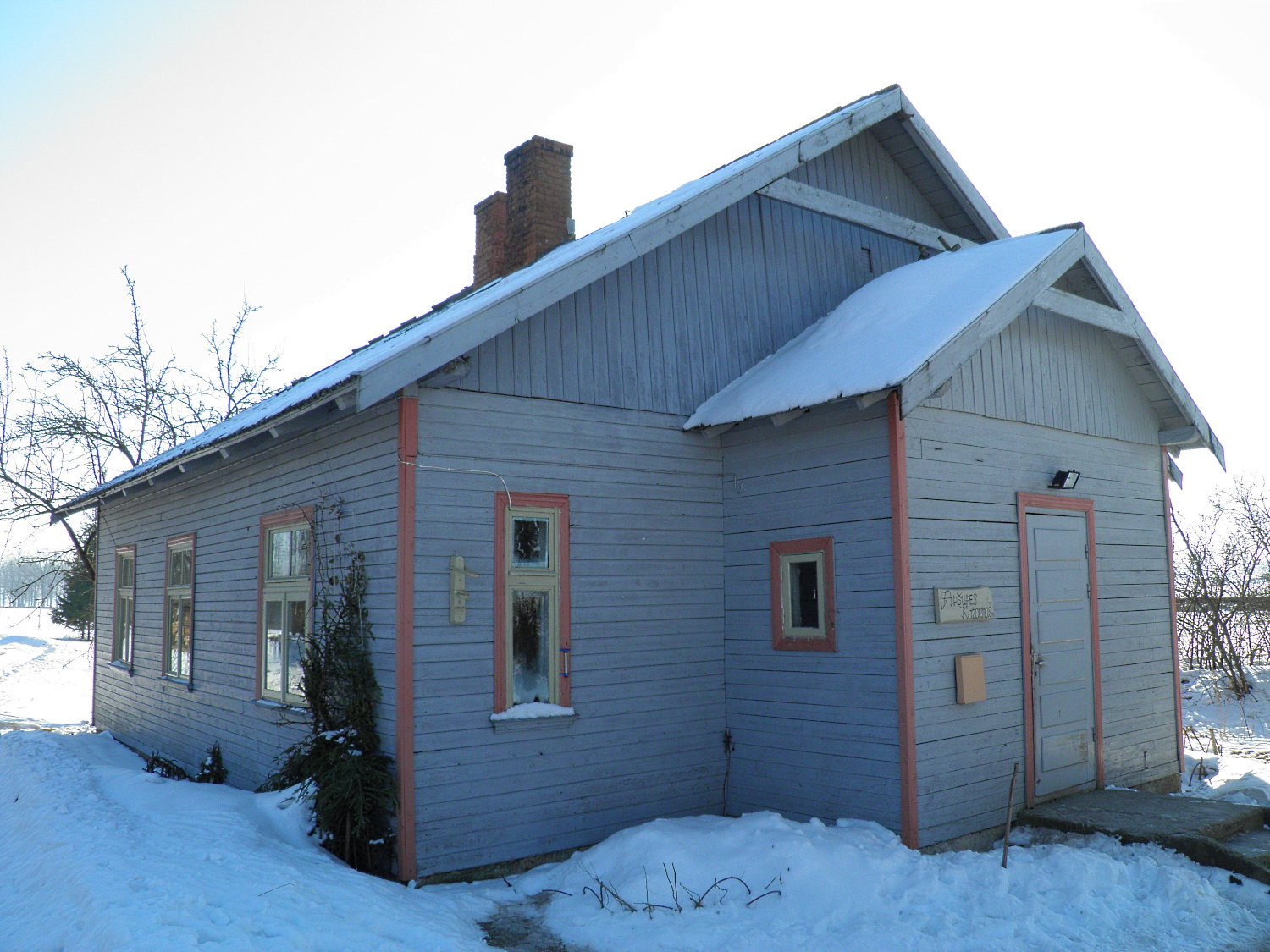

General information
- Coordinates: 56°46′33.83″N 23°22′27.66″E

Services
Preceding station	LDz	Following station
Džūkste towards Tukums II	Tukums II – Jelgava	Līvbērze towards Jelgava
Location

Apšupe Station is a railway station on the Tukums II – Jelgava Railway.
