= Milzkalne Station =

Railway station in Milzkalne, Latvia

Milzkalne
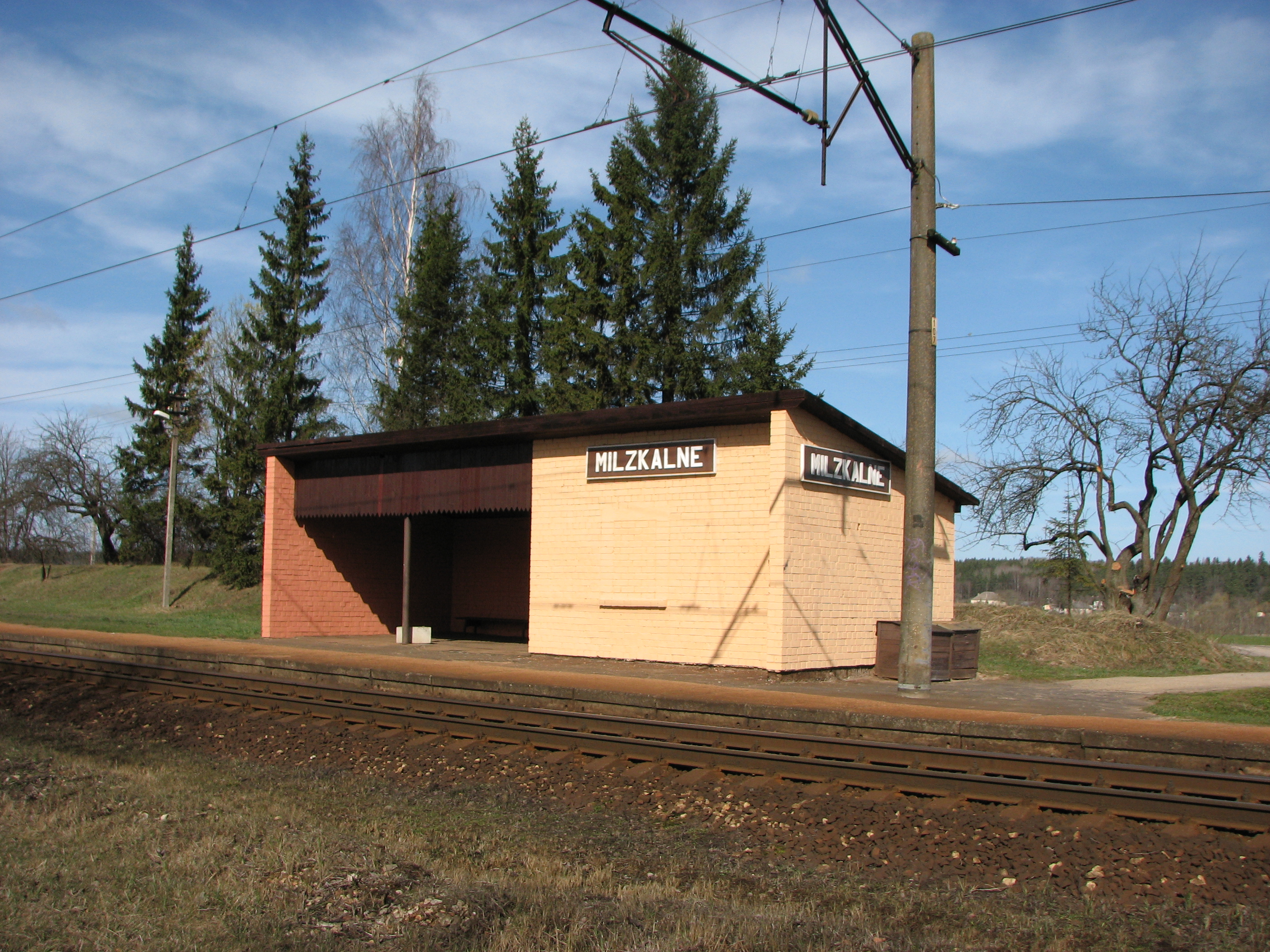

General information
- Location: Milzkalne; Smārde parish, Tukums Municipality; Latvia
- Coordinates: 56°58′12.89″N 23°13′55.95″E
- Platforms: 1
- Tracks: 1

History
- Opened: 1959

Services
| Preceding station | LDz | Following station |
|---|---|---|
| Tukums I towards Tukums II | Torņakalns–Tukums II Railway | Smārde towards Riga |
Location

Milzkalne Station is a railway halt located about 1 km (0.62 mi) south the village of Milzkalne in the Courland region of western Latvia. The railway halt is located on the Torņakalns – Tukums II Railway. Not every train stops at the Halt.
