= Smārde Station =

Railway station in Ķemeri, Latvia

Smārde
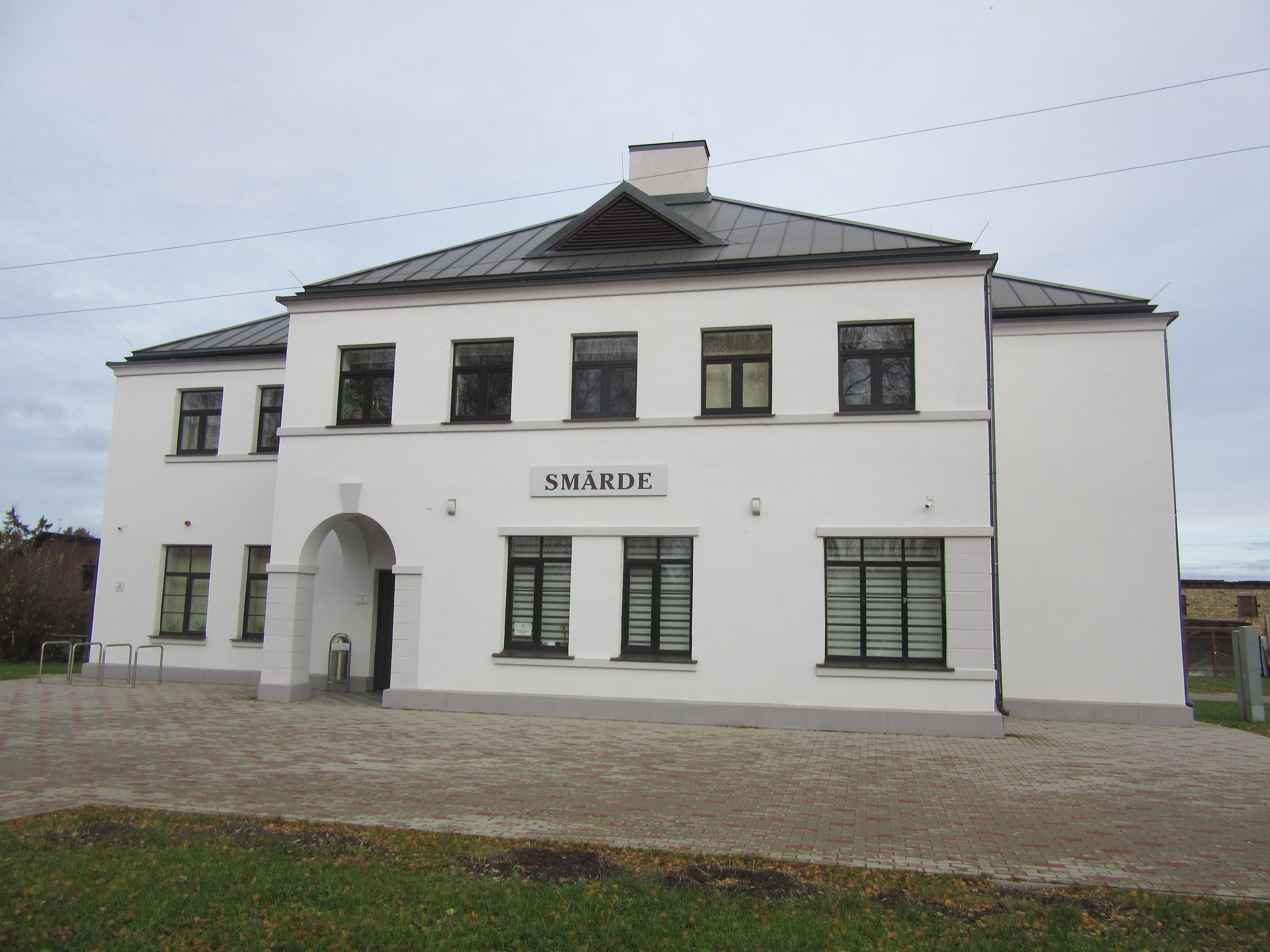

General information
- Location: Smārde; Smārde Parish, Tukums Municipality; Latvia
- Coordinates: 56°57′19″N 23°20′14″E
- Platforms: 1
- Tracks: 1

History
- Opened: 1877

Services
Preceding station	LDz	Following station
Milzkalne towards Tukums II	Torņakalns–Tukums II Railway	Kemeri towards Riga
Location

Smārde Station is a railway station serving the village of Smārde in the Courland region of western Latvia. The station is located on the railway line between Riga and Tukums.
