= Džūkste Station =

Railway station in Latvia

Džūkste
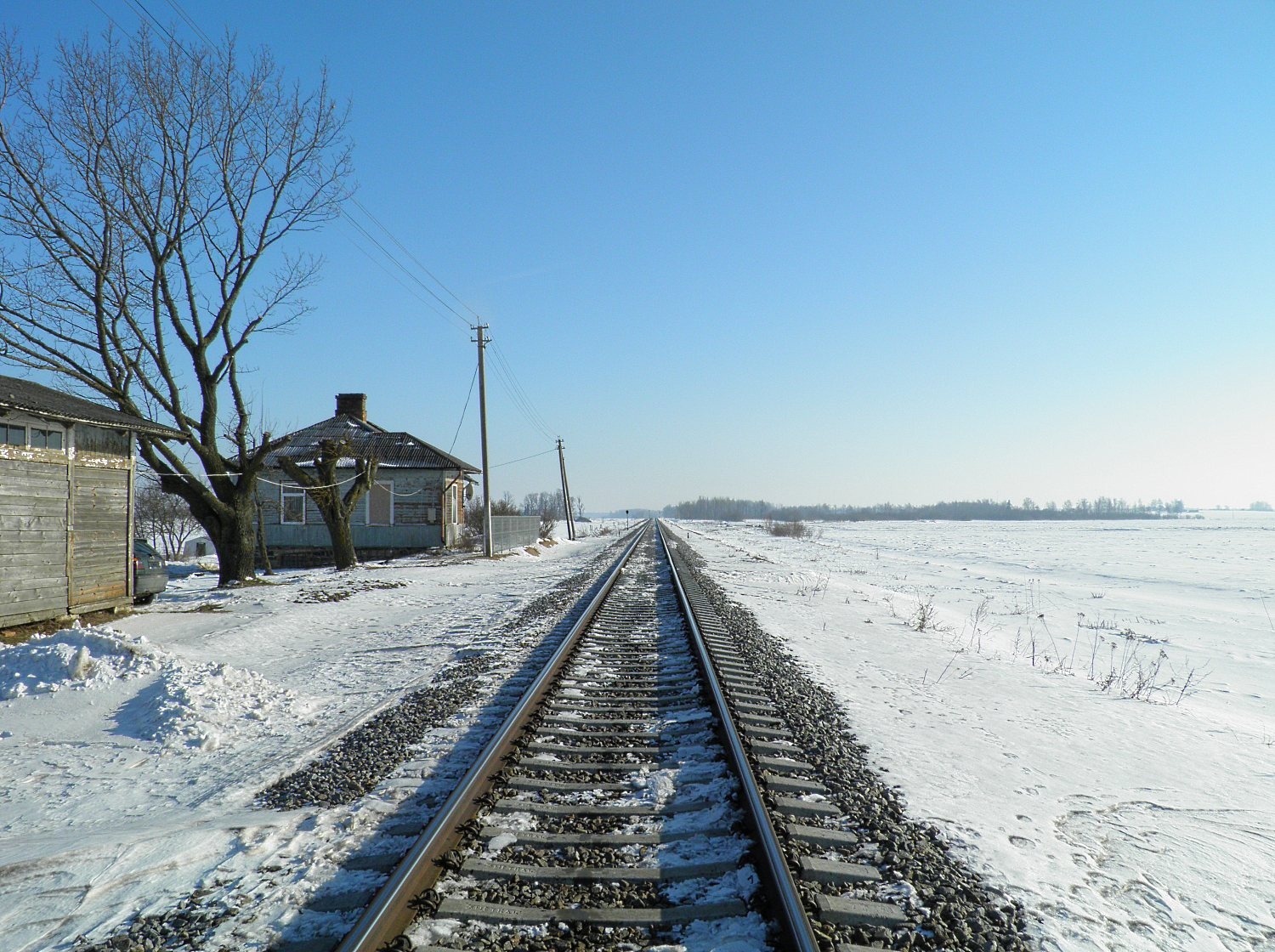

General information
- Coordinates: 56°48′27.89″N 23°20′2.59″E

Services
Preceding station	LDz	Following station
Slampe towards Tukums II	Tukums II – Jelgava	Apšupe towards Jelgava
Location

Džūkste Station is a railway station on the Tukums II – Jelgava Railway.
