= Slampe Parish =

Parish of Latvia

- parish of Latvia
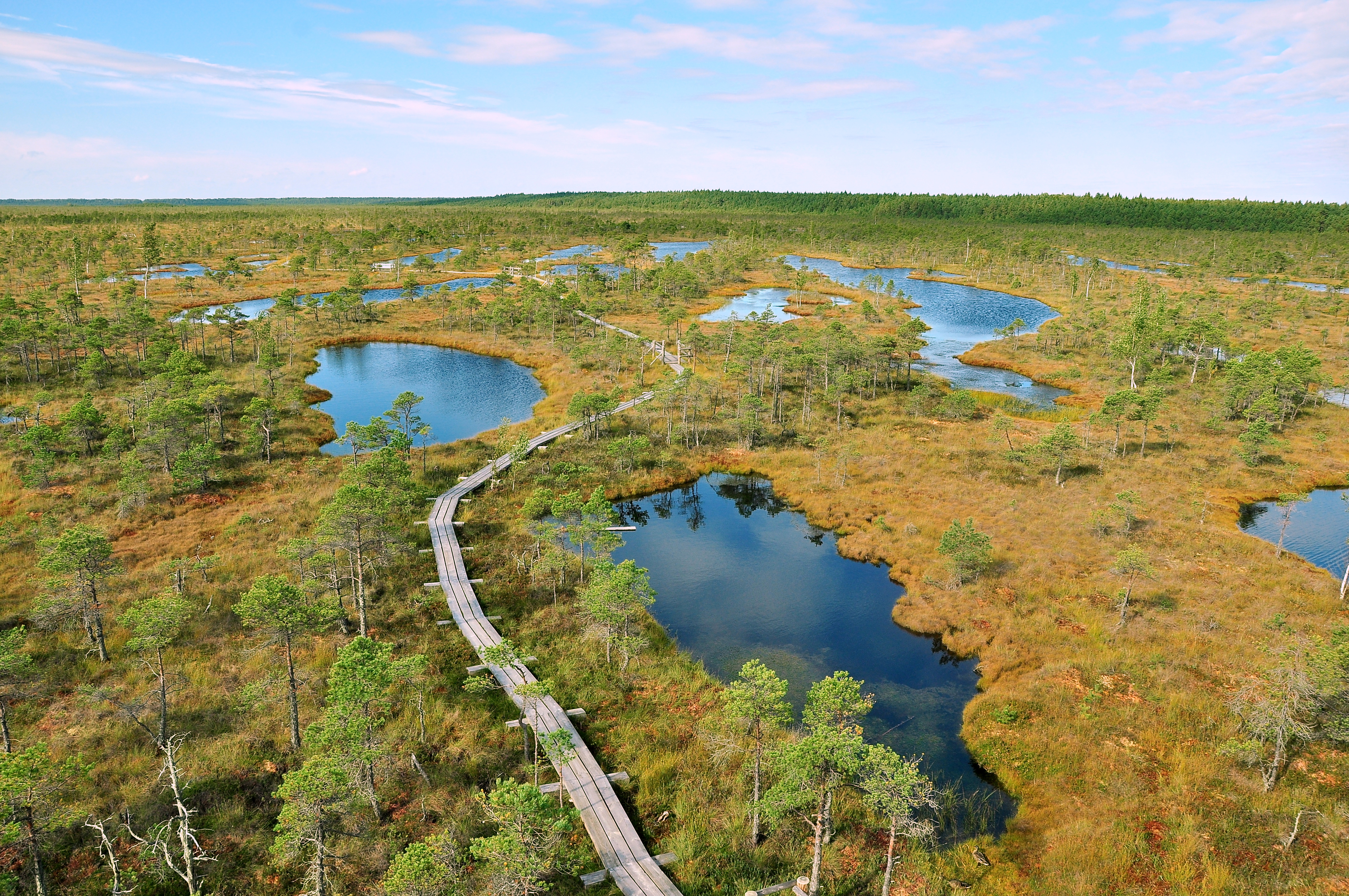

- Coat of arms

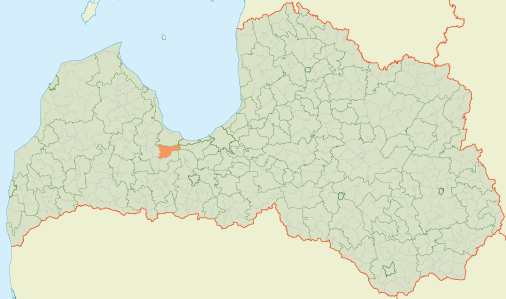
- 56°52′52″N 23°18′40″E

- Location within Latvia
- Country: Latvia

Area
  - Total: 155.04 km^{2} (59.86 sq mi)
  - Land: 151.2 km^{2} (58.4 sq mi)
  - Water: 3.84 km^{2} (1.48 sq mi)

Population (1 January 2026)
  - Total: 1,635
  - Density: 10.81/km^{2} (28.01/sq mi)

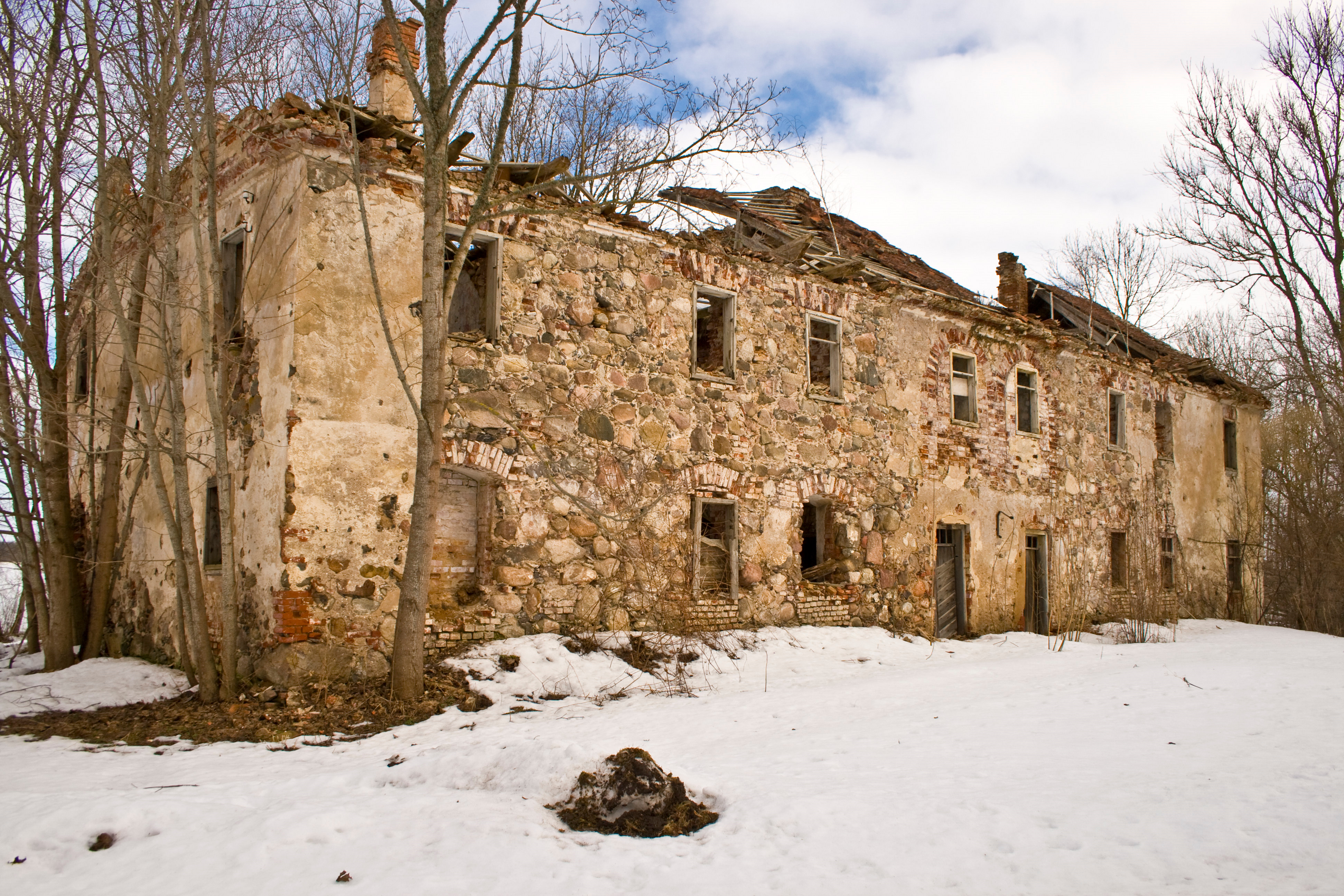
Abandoned manor in Spirgus

Slampe Parish (Latvian: Slampes pagasts) is an administrative unit of Tukums Municipality, Latvia, in the region of Semigallia. The administrative center is Slampe.

== Towns, villages and settlements of Slampe parish ==
- Ozolnieki
- Praviņi
- Slampe
- Spirgus
- Sprosti
- Vīksele
- Zvaigznes
- Cinevilla Studios

== See also ==
- Praviņi Station
- Slampe Station
