= Sloka Station =

Railway station in Sloka, Latvia

Sloka
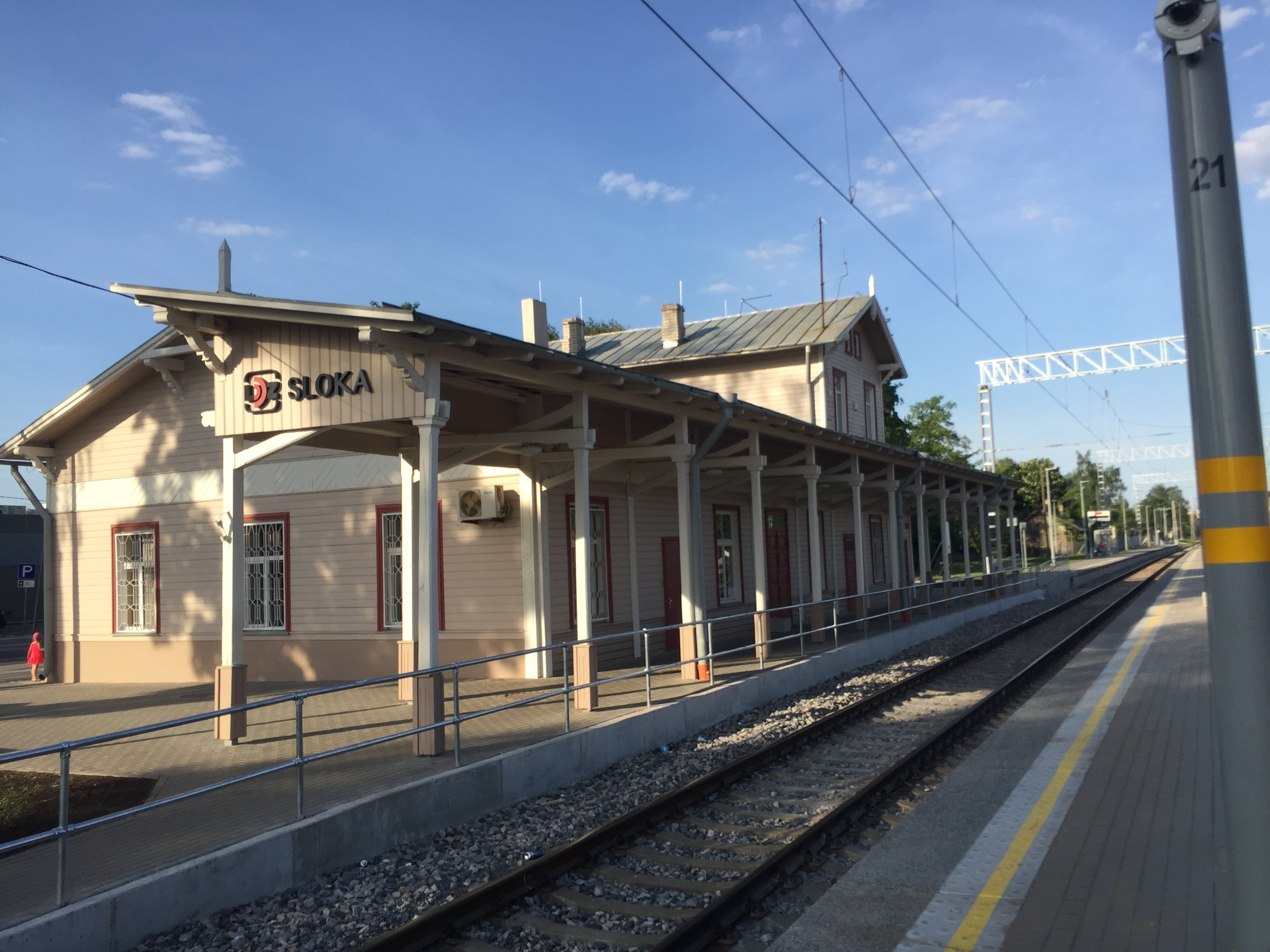

General information
- Location: Satiksmes iela 1 Sloka, Jūrmala; Latvia
- Coordinates: 56°56′50.73″N 23°37′4.94″E

Services
Preceding station	LDz	Following station
Kūdra towards Tukums II	Torņakalns–Tukums II Railway	Vaivari towards Riga
Location

Sloka Station is a railway station serving the Sloka neighbourhood of the city of Jūrmala, Latvia. It is located on the Torņakalns – Tukums II Railway line of Latvian Railways.
