= Ķemeri Station =

Railway station in Jūrmala, Latvia

Ķemeri
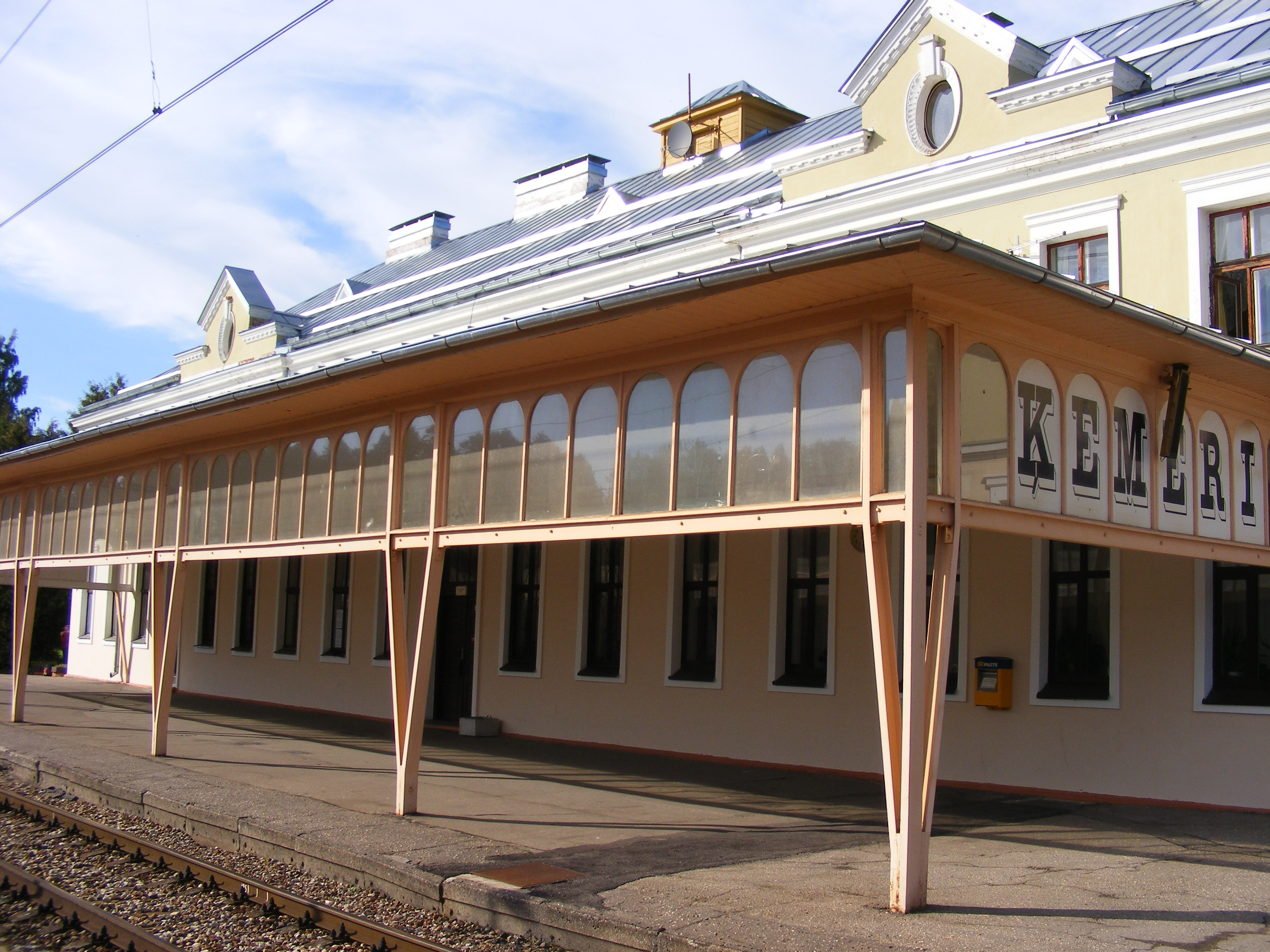

General information
- Location: Brocēnu iela 1A; Ķemeri, Jūrmala; Latvia
- Coordinates: 56°56′18.24″N 23°29′22.71″E

Services
Preceding station	LDz	Following station
Smārde towards Tukums II	Torņakalns–Tukums II Railway	Kūdra towards Riga
Location

Ķemeri Station is a railway station serving the Ķemeri neighbourhood of Jūrmala, Latvia. It is located on the Torņakalns – Tukums II Railway
