= Milzkalne =

Village in Latvia

- Village
- Location within Latvia
- Coordinates: 56.976773°N 23.222364°E
- Country: Latvia
- Municipality: Tukums
- Parish: Smārde
- Time zone: UTC+2 (EET)
  - Summer (DST): UTC+3 (EEST)

Milzkalne is a village in the Smārde Parish of Tukums Municipality in the Courland region of Latvia. The village was added to the Smārde district in 1965 as a Soviet collective farm during the Soviet Latvia (Latvian: Padomju Latvija) period. The Šlokenbeka Castle, a medieval fortified manor built in the 15th century, is located in Milzkalne. Inside the Šlokenbeka Castles rooms there is a small Restaurant, hotel and The Latvian Road Museum.

Milzkalne railway halt is situated about 1 km (0.62 mi) south of the village, and is located on the railway line between Riga and Tukums.
