= Līgciems Station =

Railway station in Latvia

Līgciems

General information
- Coordinates: 57°6′6.60″N 22°44′33.49″E
- System: LDz commuter
- Line: Ventspils I – Tukums II
- Tracks: 1

History
- Opened: 1931; 95 years ago
Route map
Location

Līgciems Station is a railway station on the Ventspils I – Tukums II Railway.
