= Pūre Station =

Railway station in Latvia

Pūre
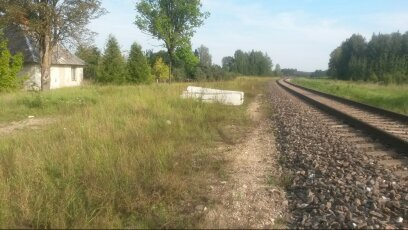
- Pūre in 2016

General information
- Coordinates: 57°3′47.07″N 22°53′37.16″E
- System: LDz commuter
- Line: Ventspils I – Tukums II
- Tracks: 1

History
- Opened: 1925; 101 years ago
Route map
Location

Pūre Station is a railway station on the Ventspils I – Tukums II Railway, in Latvia.
