= Asari Station =

Asari Station may refer to:

- Asari Station (Hokkaido), in Otaru, Hokkaido, Japan
- Asari Station (Shimane), in Gōtsu, Shimane Prefecture, Japan
- Asari station (Latvia), in Jūrmala, Latvia
