= Elkšķene Station =

Railway station in Latvia

Elkšķene

General information
- Coordinates: 57°21′15.88″N 21°46′41.21″E
- Operated by: Latvian Railways
- Line: Ventspils I – Tukums II
- Tracks: 2

History
- Opened: 1927; 99 years ago
- Previous names: Pope (1927–1932)
Route map
Location

Elkšķene Station is a railway station on the Ventspils I – Tukums II Railway, in Latvia.
