= Kudra (disambiguation) =

Kudra is a city in Kaimur district in the state of Bihar, India.

Kudra may also refer to:

- Kūdra Station, a railway station on the Torņakalns–Tukums II Railway in Latvia
- Kūdra, a village in Aizpute Parish, Aizpute Municipality, Latvia
- Kūdra, a village in Sala Parish, Babīte Municipality, Latvia
- Jan Kudra (born 1937), a Polish former cyclist
- Kudra, character in 1984 Tom Robbins' novel Jitterbug Perfume
