= Slampe Station =

Railway station in Latvia

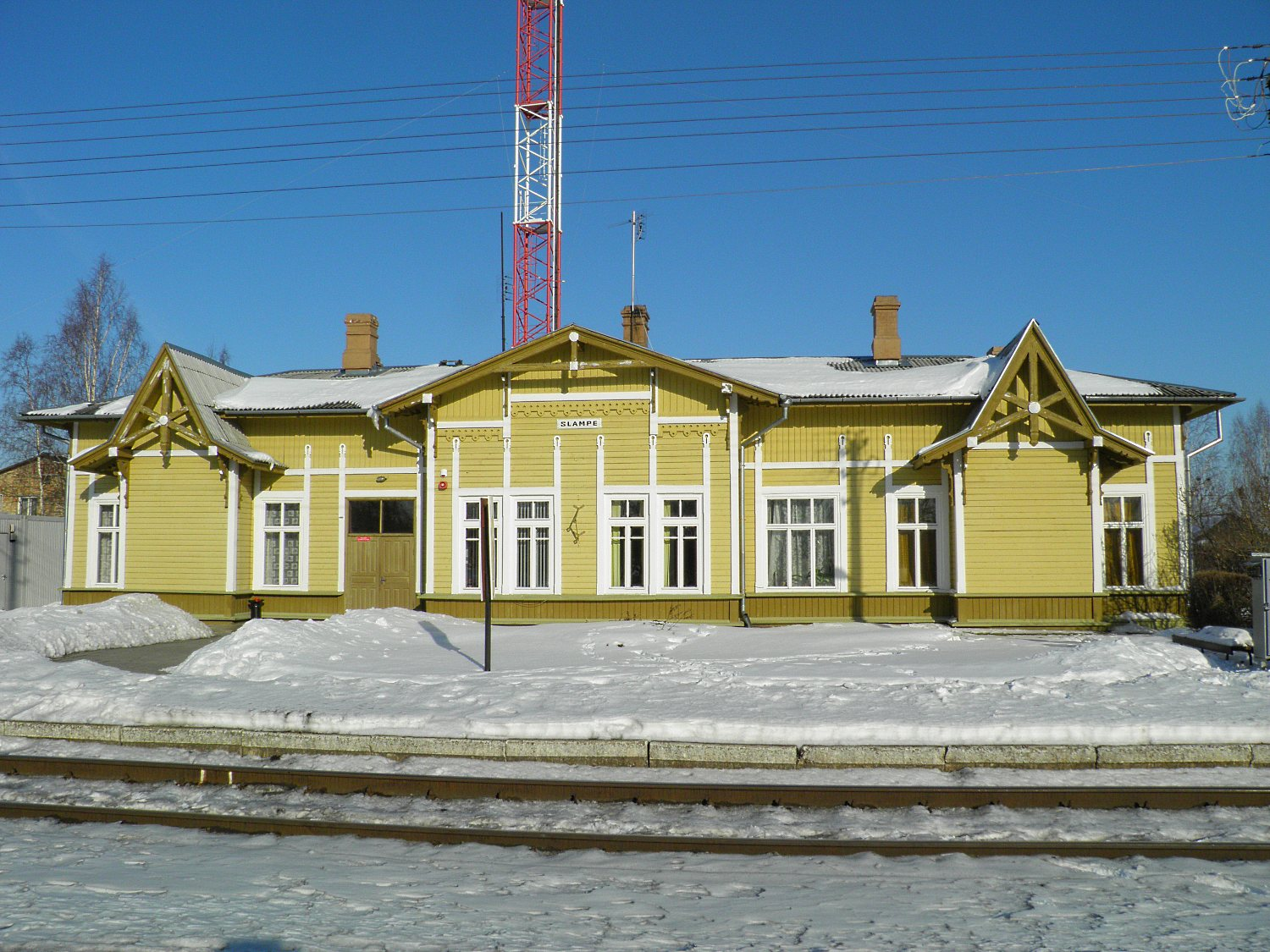

General information
- Coordinates: 56°50′40.61″N 23°17′32.42″E

Services
Preceding station	LDz	Following station
Praviņi towards Tukums II	Tukums II – Jelgava	Džūkste towards Jelgava
Location

Slampe Station is a railway station on the Tukums II – Jelgava Railway.
