= Kandava Station =

Railway station in Latvia

General information
- Coordinates: 57°4′58.70″N 22°49′10.04″E
- System: LDz freight station
- Line: Ventspils I – Tukums II
- Platforms: 1 side platform
- Tracks: 4

History
- Opened: 1931; 95 years ago
- Former names: Cēre
Route map
Location

Kandava Station is a railway station on the Ventspils I – Tukums II Railway in Latvia.
