= Šlokenbeka Castle =

Castle in Latvia

- Courland in Latvia
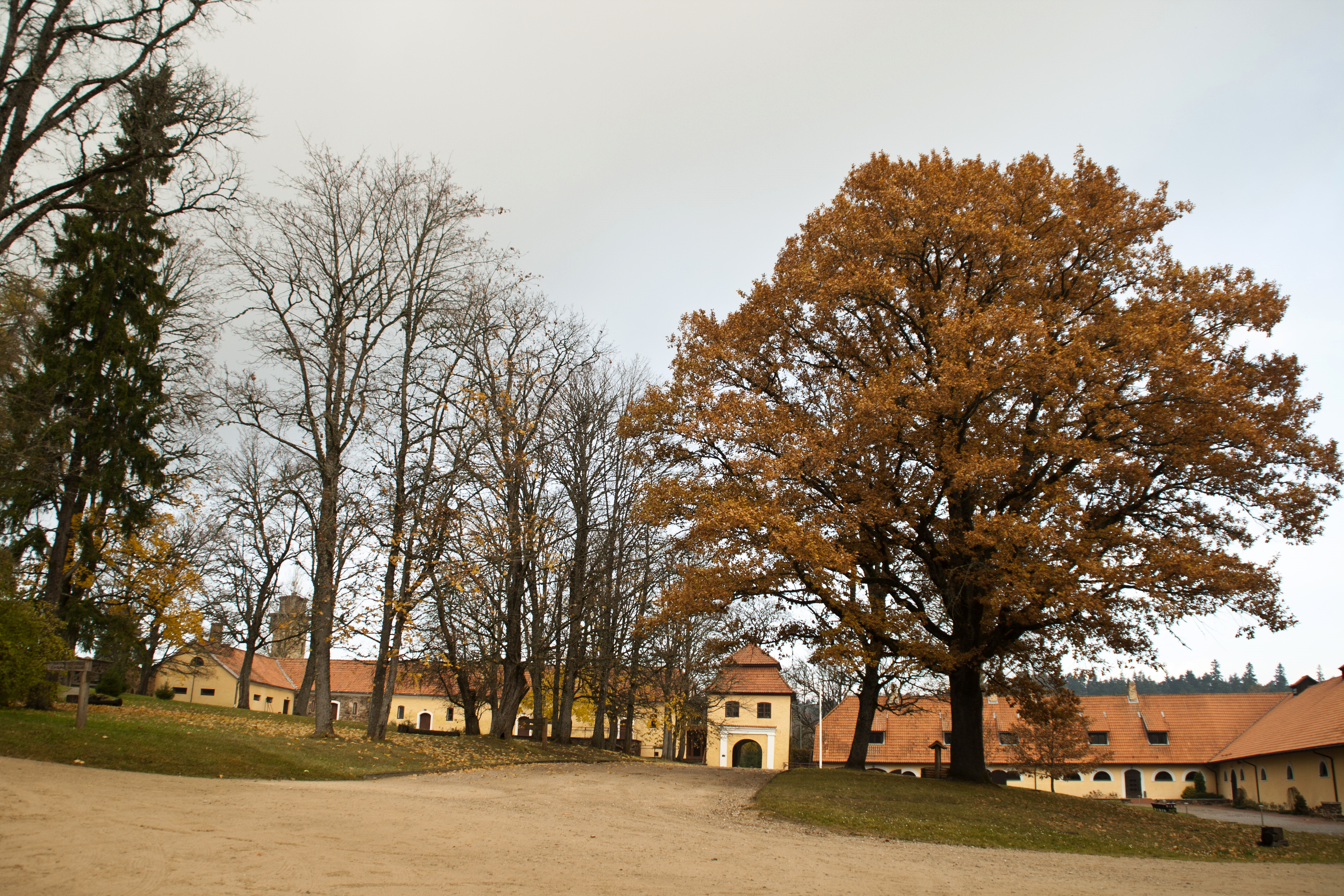

Site information
- Type: Castle
- Open to the public: yes
- Condition: transformed, good

Location
- Shown within Latvia
- Coordinates: 56.976772°N 23.222364°E

Site history
- Built: before 1544
- Materials: brick, boulders

Šlokenbeka Castle (Latvian: Šlokenbekas pils, German: Ordensburg Schlockenbeck) is a fortified manor in the Smārde Parish of Tukums Municipality, in the Courland region of Latvia. It is the only existing example of a fortified manor centre in Latvia. It started its existence as a castle of the Livonian Order before 1544. In 1845 Šlokenbeka manor house was built inside the defensive walls of the castle.

== History ==
Šlokenbeka was built in the 15th century as a fortified castle in the Milzkalne village. It was built in a trapeze-type yard, which was enclosed with stone walls and portholes. In 1772 the attic roofs were added to the building. In the seventeenth century towers with portals and weathervanes were erected, but Šlokenbeka lost its defence function, being then adapted for domestic purposes.

At the end of the eighteenth century new buildings were built and old buildings were renewed. New gate towers were added at the north and south walls. Between 1841 and 1845, a new manor house in classicist style was built at the north wall. In the 1930s Šlokenbeka lost some of its buildings. During Soviet times it housed the 5th road maintenance unit. Now it contains the Latvian Road Construction History Museum and a restaurant.

== See also ==
- List of castles in Latvia
