= Ventspils II Station =

Railway station in Latvia

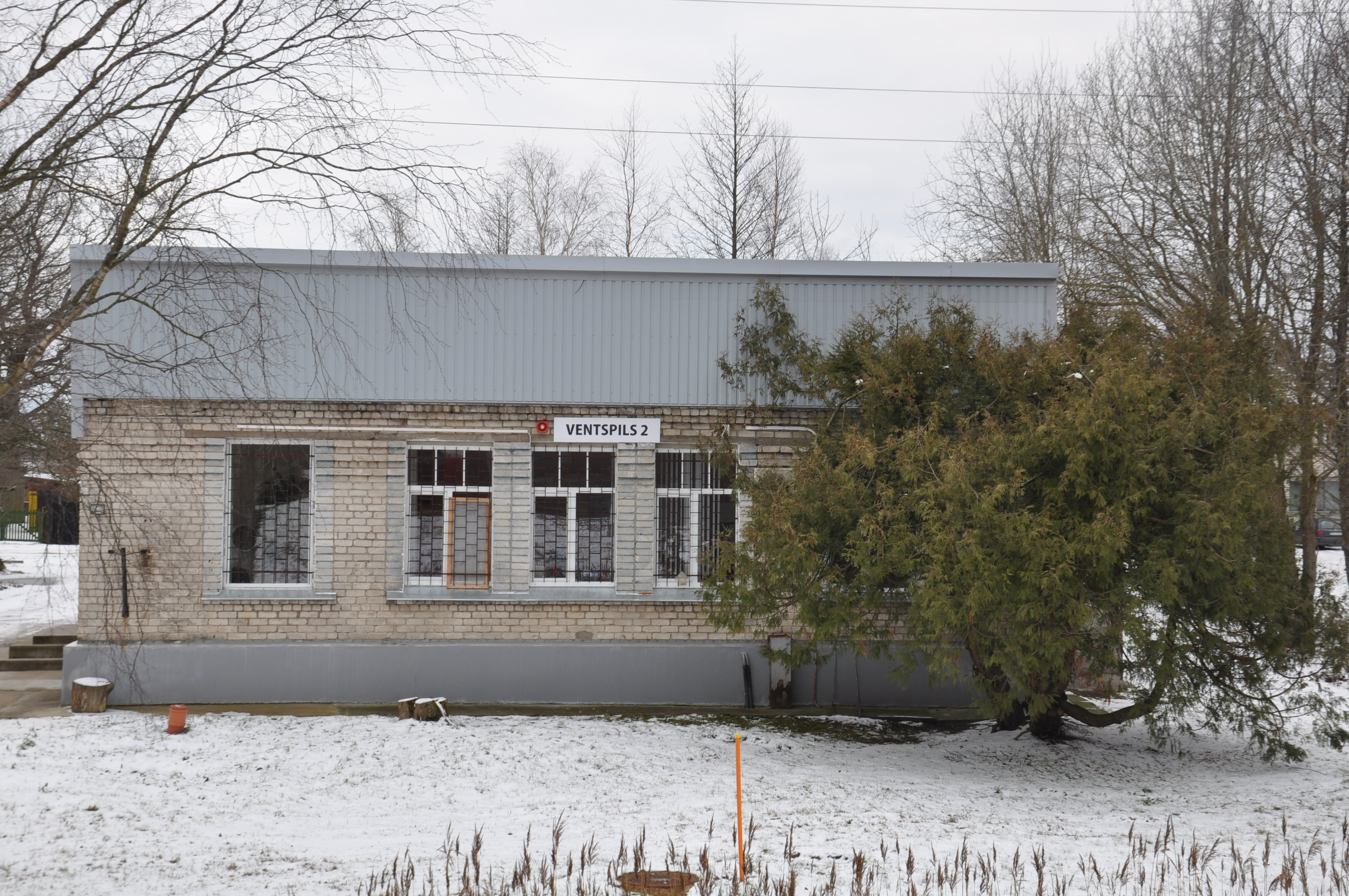
- Station Building

General information
- Coordinates: 57°23′2.93″N 21°40′11.27″E
- System: LDz freight station
- Line: Ventspils I – Tukums II
- Platforms: 1 side
- Tracks: 5

History
- Former names: Ventspils 2
Route map
Location

Ventspils II Station is a railway station on the Ventspils I – Tukums II Railway.
