= Vaivari Station =

Railway stop in Jūrmala, Latvia

Vaivari
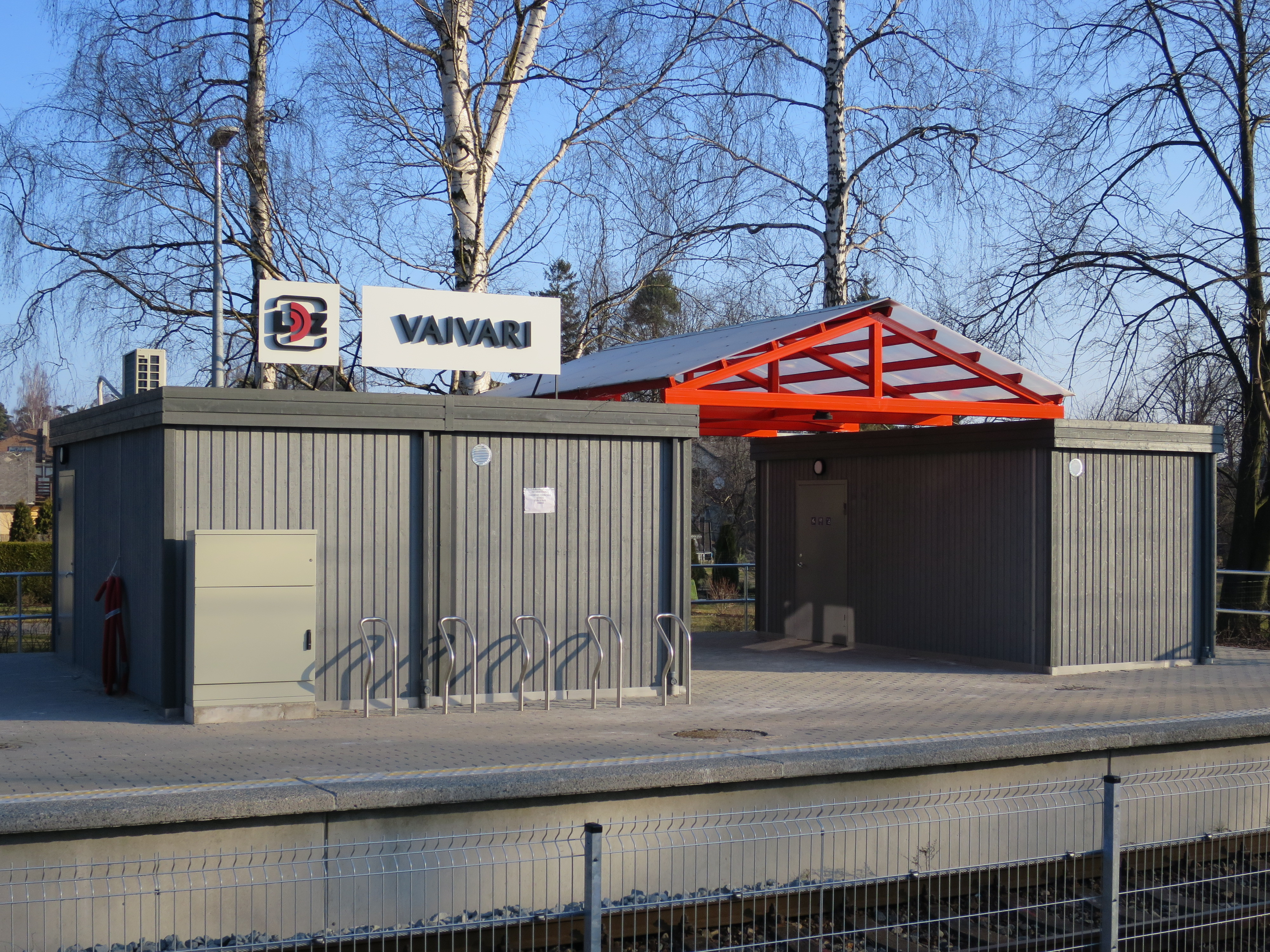
- Vaivari Station in 2016 after reconstration.

General information
- Location: Skautu iela 23; Vaivari, Jūrmala; Latvia
- Coordinates: 56°57′18.29″N 23°40′8.49″E

Services
Preceding station	LDz	Following station
Sloka towards Tukums II	Torņakalns–Tukums II Railway	Asari towards Riga
Location

Vaivari Station is a railway station serving the Vaivari neighbourhood of the city of Jūrmala, Latvia. The station is located on the Torņakalns – Tukums II Railway. Vaivari is the terminal of the B ticket area.

== Reconstruction controversy ==
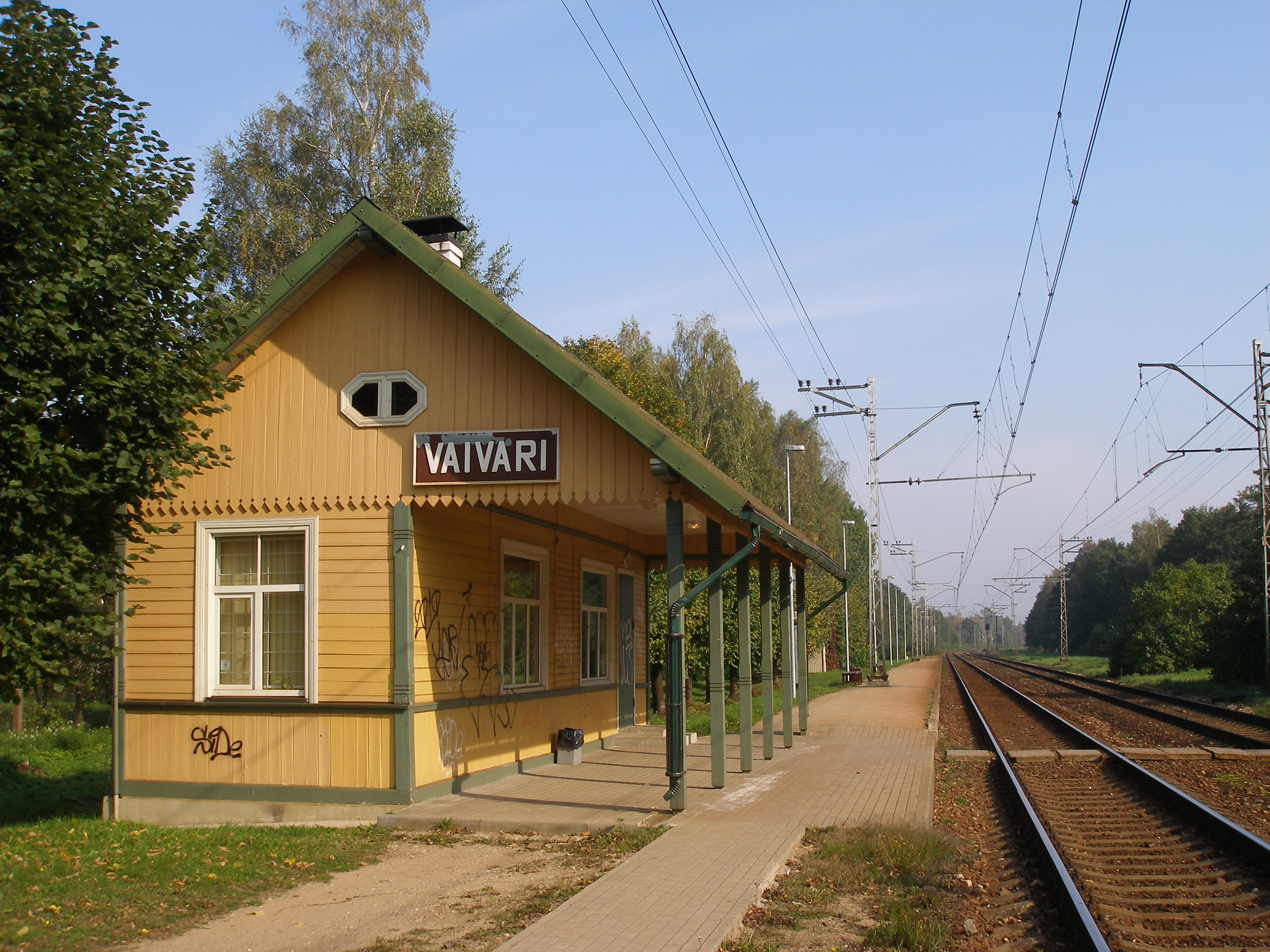
Old building, now demolished.

During the modernization a new modular station was built, a tree-covered building in which ticket sales will take place, and a toilet is also available. At the time of modernization, the old building was demolished, the station building was moved and the old toilet was removed. The demolition of the old station building, and the replacement with metal containers, caused a great deal of indignation in society and in the media.
