= Puze Station =

Railway station in Latvia

Puze
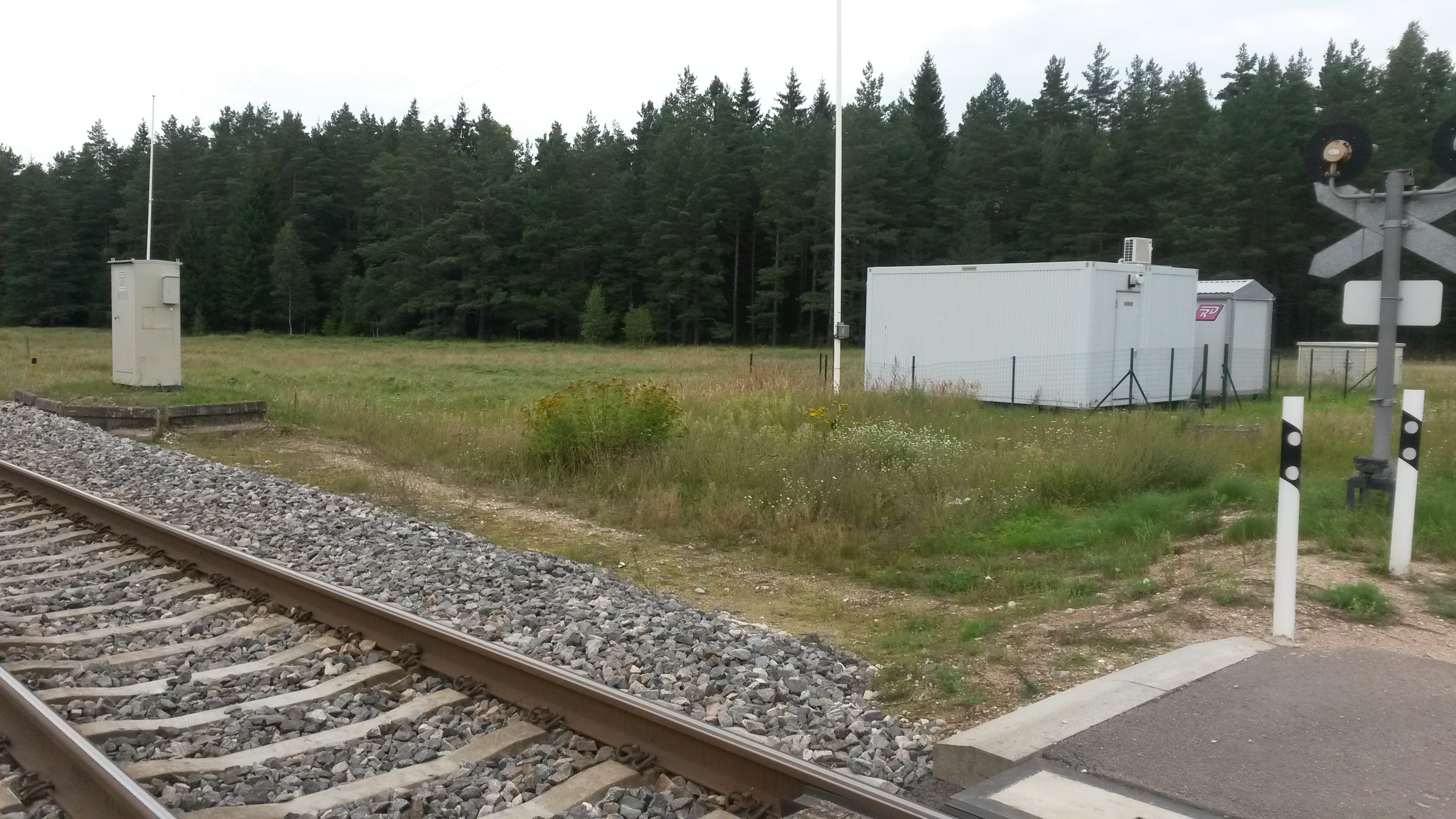
- Puze stopping point in 2016

General information
- Coordinates: 57°18′31.93″N 21°55′56.00″E
- System: LDz commuter
- Line: Ventspils I – Tukums II
- Platforms: 1 (unused)
- Tracks: 1

History
- Opened: 1938; 88 years ago
Route map
Location

Puze Station is a railway station on the Ventspils I – Tukums II Railway, in Latvia.
