= Usma Station =

Railway station in Latvia

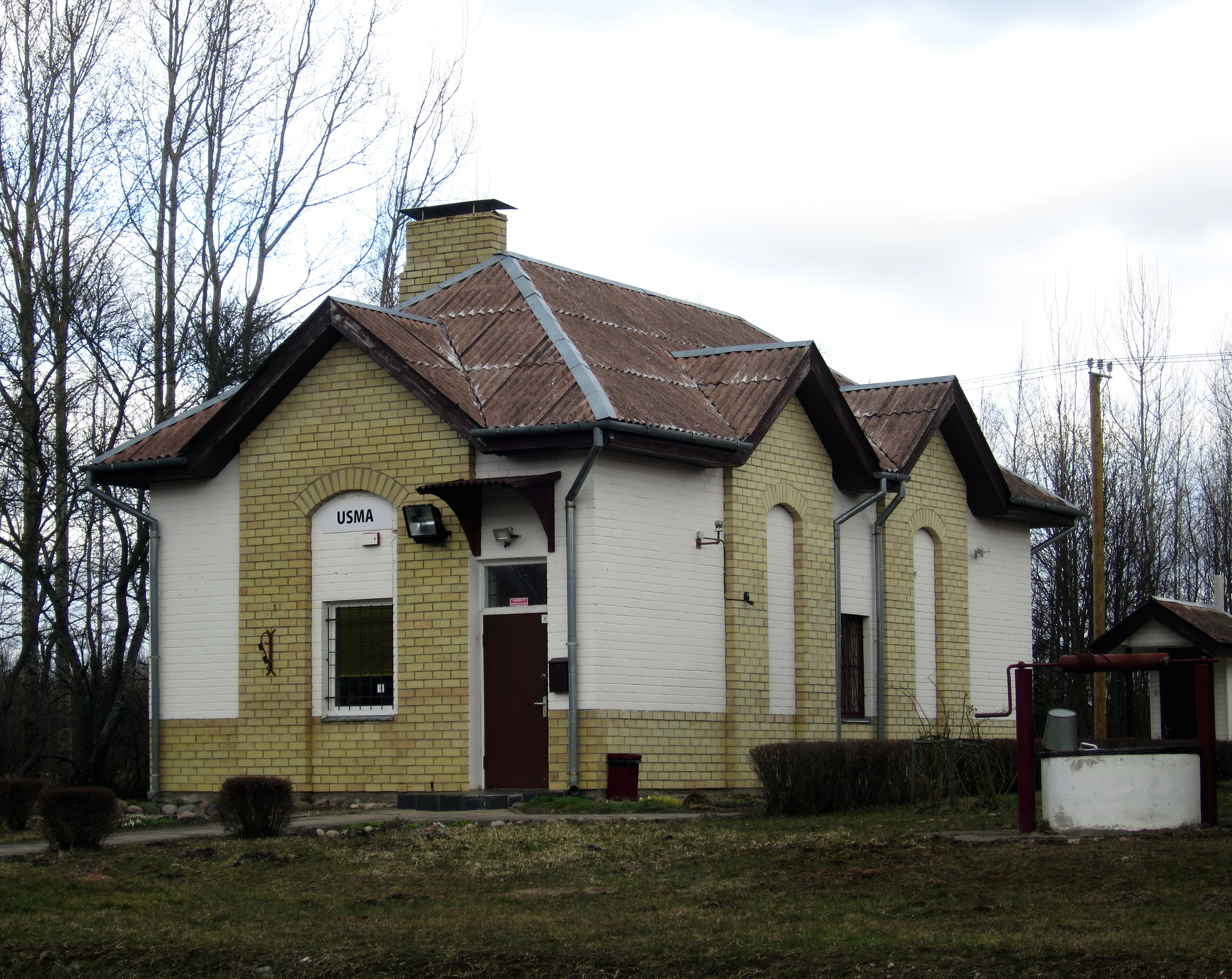
- The station in 2019

General information
- Coordinates: 57°15′2.07″N 22°10′11.60″E
- System: LDz freight station
- Line: Ventspils I – Tukums II
- Platforms: 1 side
- Tracks: 2

History
- Opened: 1920; 106 years ago
- Former names: Latvian: Usmaiten
Route map
Location

Usma Station is a railway station on the Ventspils I – Tukums II Railway, in Latvia.
