= Ugāle Station =

Railway station in Latvia

Ugāle
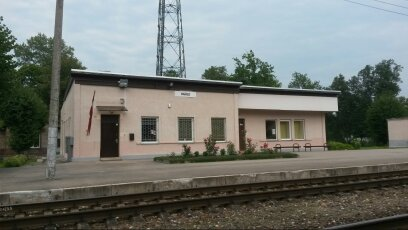
- Ugāle Station in 2016

General information
- Coordinates: 57°16′54.69″N 22°0′40.12″E
- Operator: Latvian Railways
- Line: Ventspils I – Tukums II
- Tracks: 4

History
- Opened: 1901; 125 years ago
Route map
Location

Ugāle Station is a Latvian railway station on the Ventspils I – Tukums II Railway. It serves as a key stop along this railway line, which connects the port city of Ventspils with Tukums, facilitating both passenger and freight transport.
