= Līči Station =

Railway station in Latvia

Līči
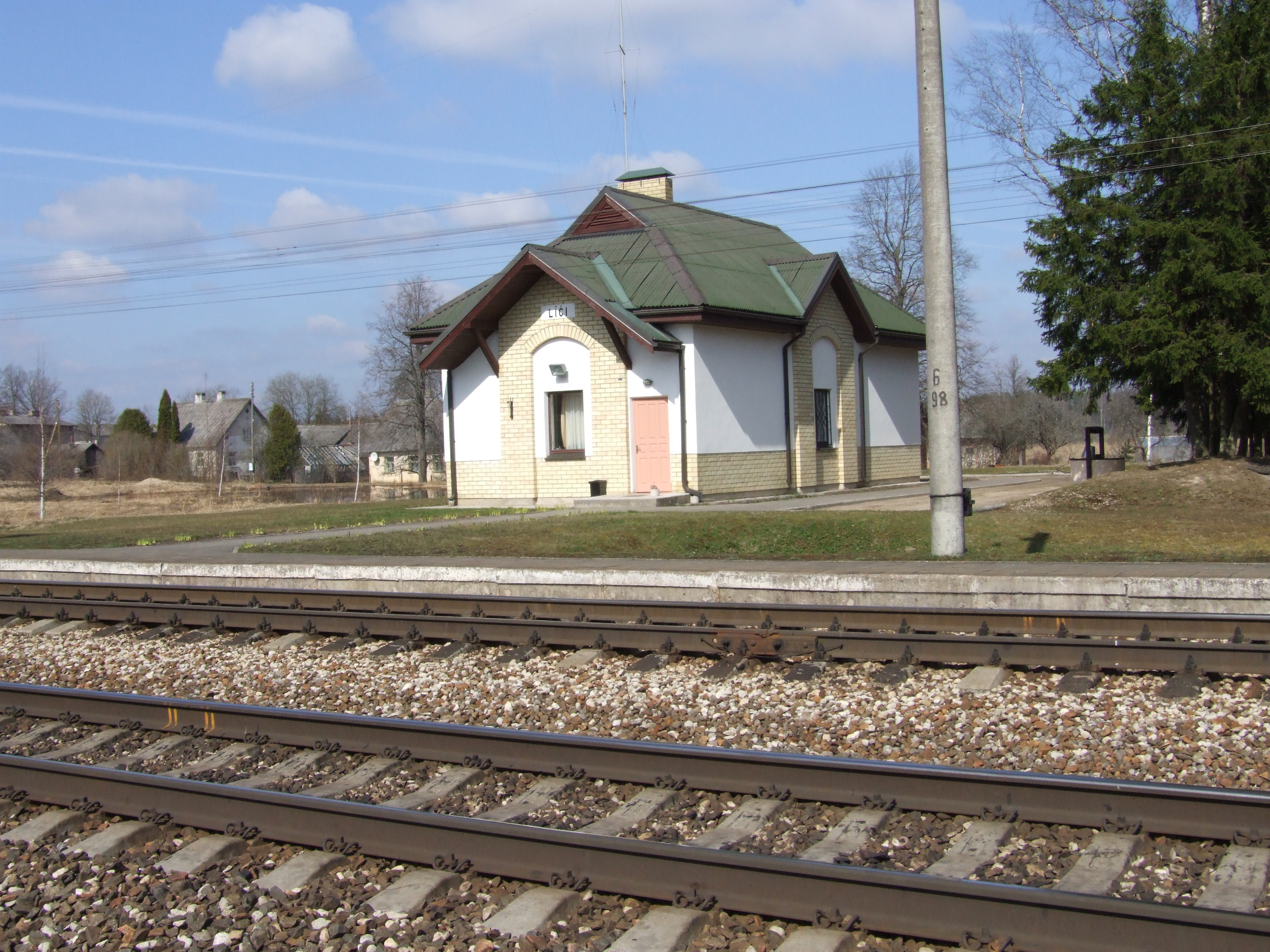
- The station in 2009

General information
- Coordinates: 57°10′40.80″N 22°25′14.47″E
Location

Līči Station is a railway station on the Ventspils I – Tukums II Railway.
