= Asari, Latvia =

Neighbourhood of Jūrmala

Asari
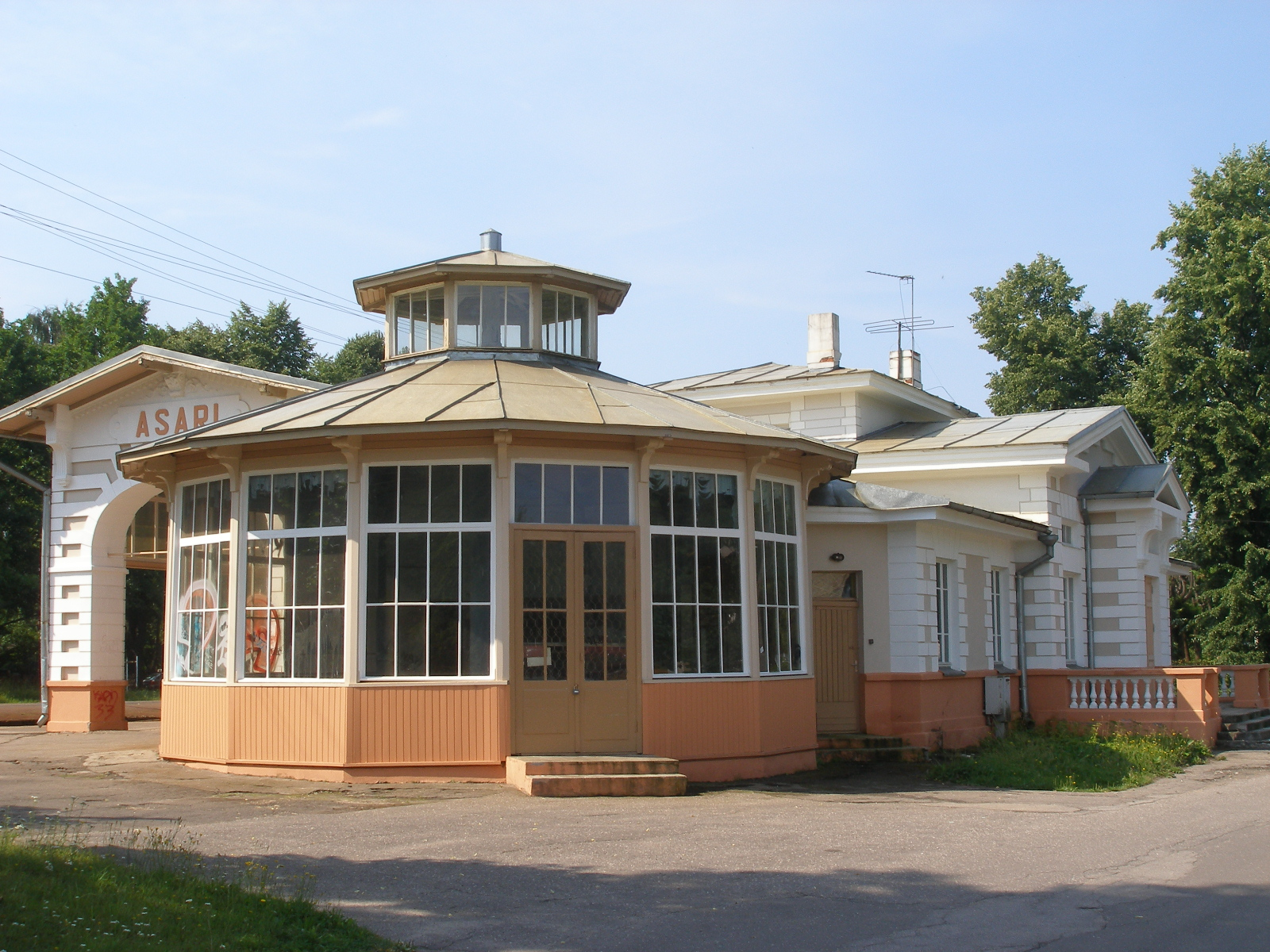
- Asari railway station

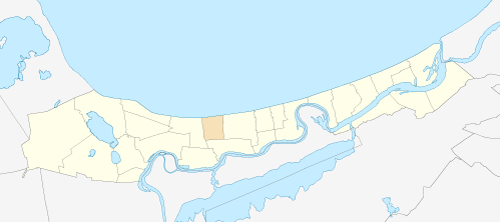
- Location in Jūrmala

- Location in Latvia
- Coordinates: 56°57′26″N 23°41′16″E
- Country: Latvia
- City: Jūrmala

Area
  - Total: 2.1 km^{2} (0.81 sq mi)
- Elevation: 3 m (9.8 ft)

Population (2008)
  - Total: 1,428
  - Density: 680/km^{2} (1,800/sq mi)

Asari (German: Assern)is a residential area and neighbourhood of the city of Jūrmala, Latvia.

== History ==
The name Asari originated from peasant homes of the same name, which were mentioned in the area in 1713. In the Sloka church's records there were also Lielasaras and Mazasaras houses in the dunes. From them gradually formed the village of fishermen. Village inhabitants were not only fishing, but also cultivated strawberry that were brought from France by one owner of the holiday cottage in 1877.

The Asari railway station was opened in 1877.

Asari is a popular holiday destination in Jūrmala - there used to be a water park just several hundred meters from the sea. Now it mostly consists of summer houses of inhabitants of Riga.

== Asari cemetery ==
The Asaru Cemetery is located on the side of the sea at Kāpu Street 85. It has notable monument dedicated to Latvian riflemen perished in 1915–1919 in World War I and the Latvian War of Independence. Monument was created by sculptor Mārtiņš Šmalcs and architect Nikolai Voits in 1939 and restored in 1993. 247 Latvian and Russian soldiers who died on the territory of Jurmala and its surroundings were buried there.

== Notable people ==
- Volferts Gerhards fon Rādens (1893–1943), Baltic nobleman of German descent was born in Asari.
- Alfrēds Kalniņš, composer, lived in Asari from 1938 until his death in 1951.
