= Zvāre Station =

Railway station in Latvia

Zvāre
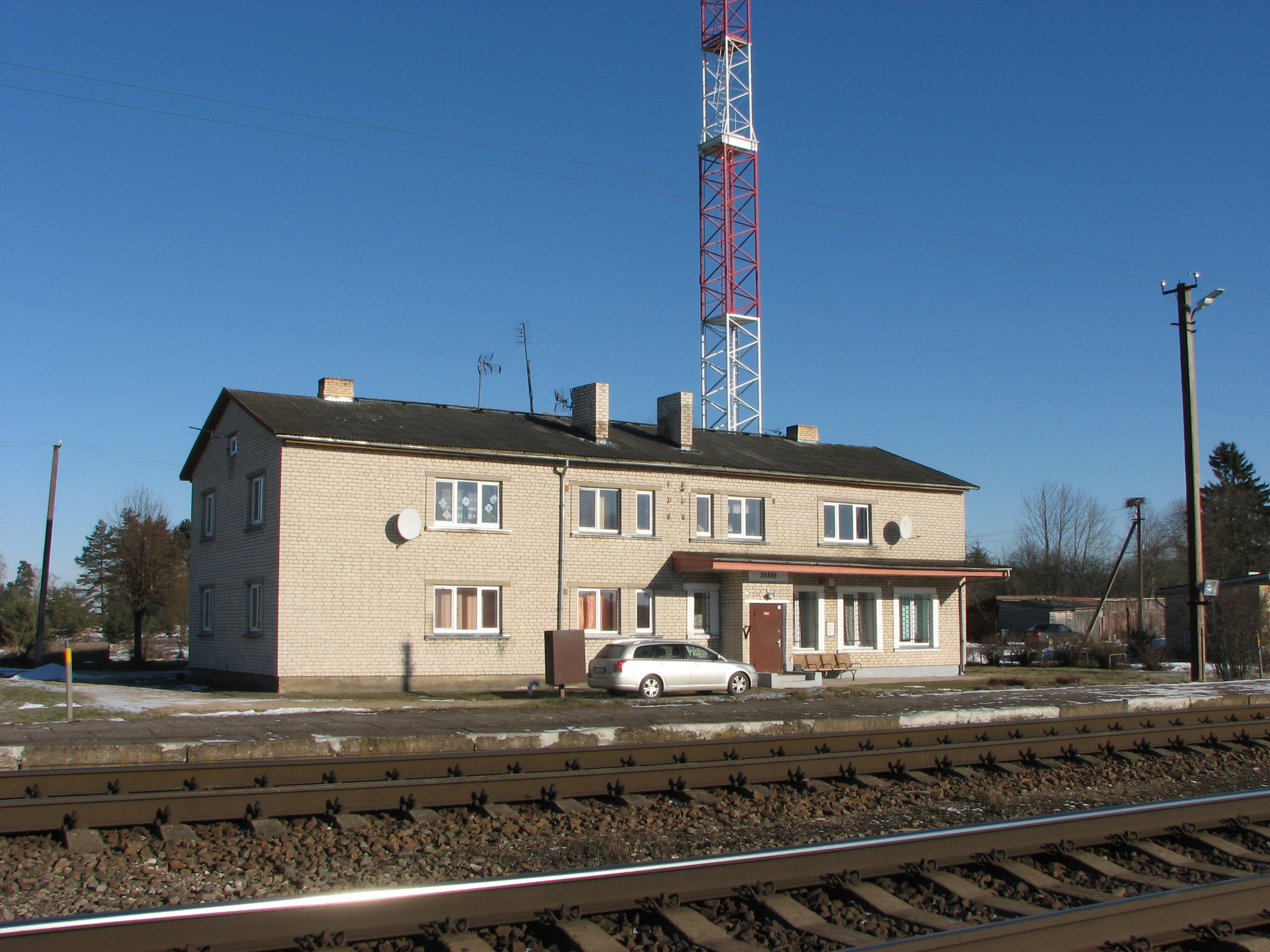
- Zvāre Station in 2017

General information
- Coordinates: 57°1′8.71″N 23°0′2.16″E
- System: LDz commuter
- Line: Ventspils I – Tukums II
- Platforms: 1 side
- Tracks: 2
Route map
Location

Zvāre Station is a railway station on the Ventspils I – Tukums II Railway in Latvia.
