= Vaivari =

Neighbourhood of Jurmala, Latvia

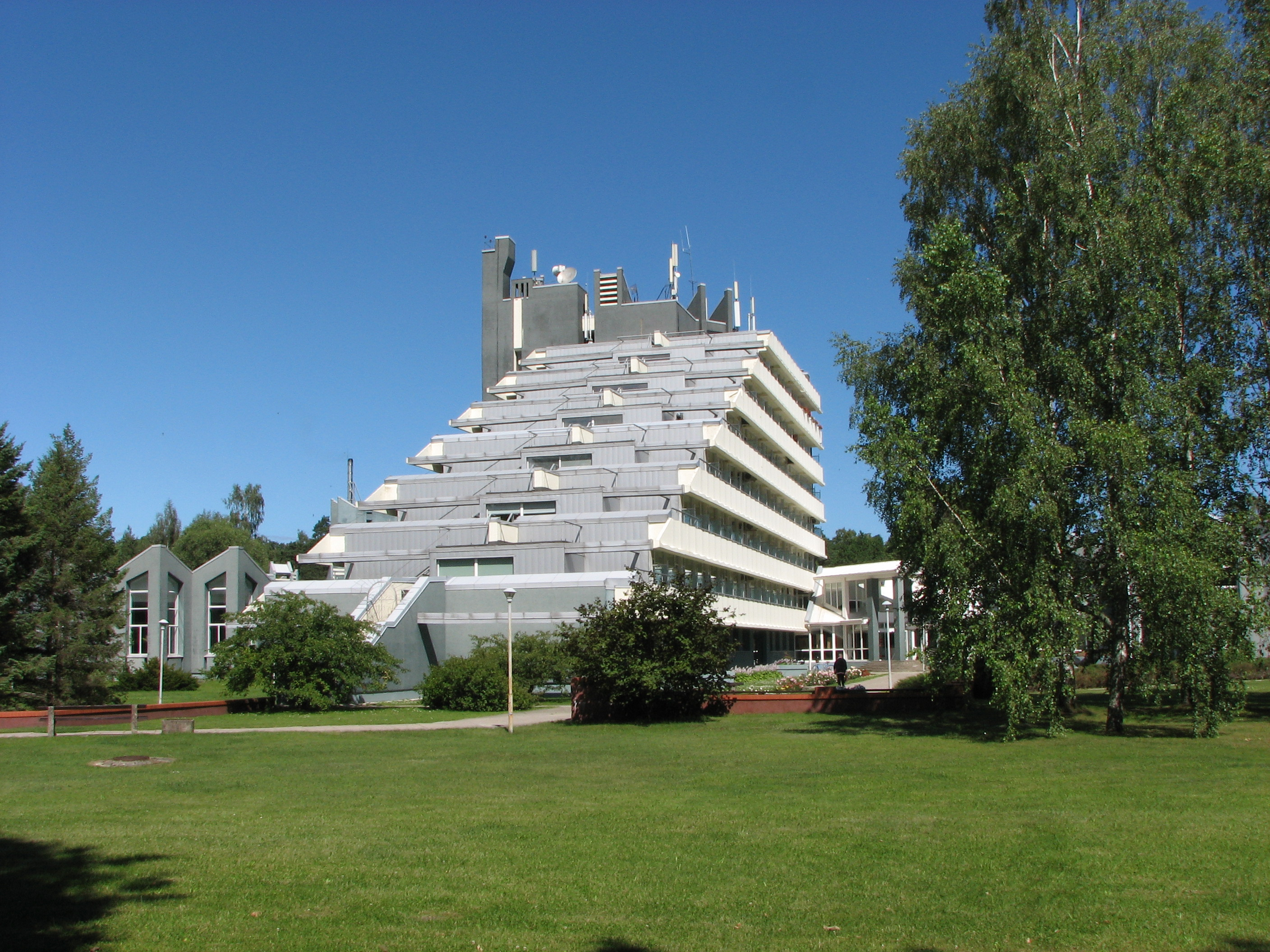
- National Rehabilitation Centre "Vaivari"

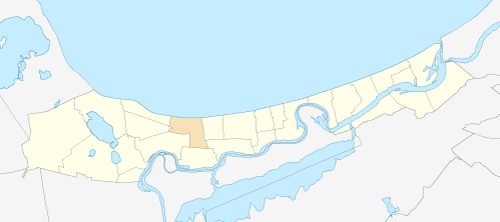
- Location in Jūrmala

- Location in Latvia
- Coordinates: 56°58′N 23°39′E
- Country: Latvia
- City: Jūrmala

Area
  - Total: 3.4 km^{2} (1.3 sq mi)
- Elevation: 3 m (9.8 ft)

Population (2008)
  - Total: 697
  - Density: 205/km^{2} (530/sq mi)

Vaivari is a residential area and neighbourhood of the city Jūrmala, Latvia. National Rehabilitation Centre "Vaivari" is located there.

== History ==
The Vaivari railway station was established in 1927, originally named Asari II. It was renamed Vaivari in 1938.
