= Asari station (Latvia) =

Railway station in Latvia

Asari
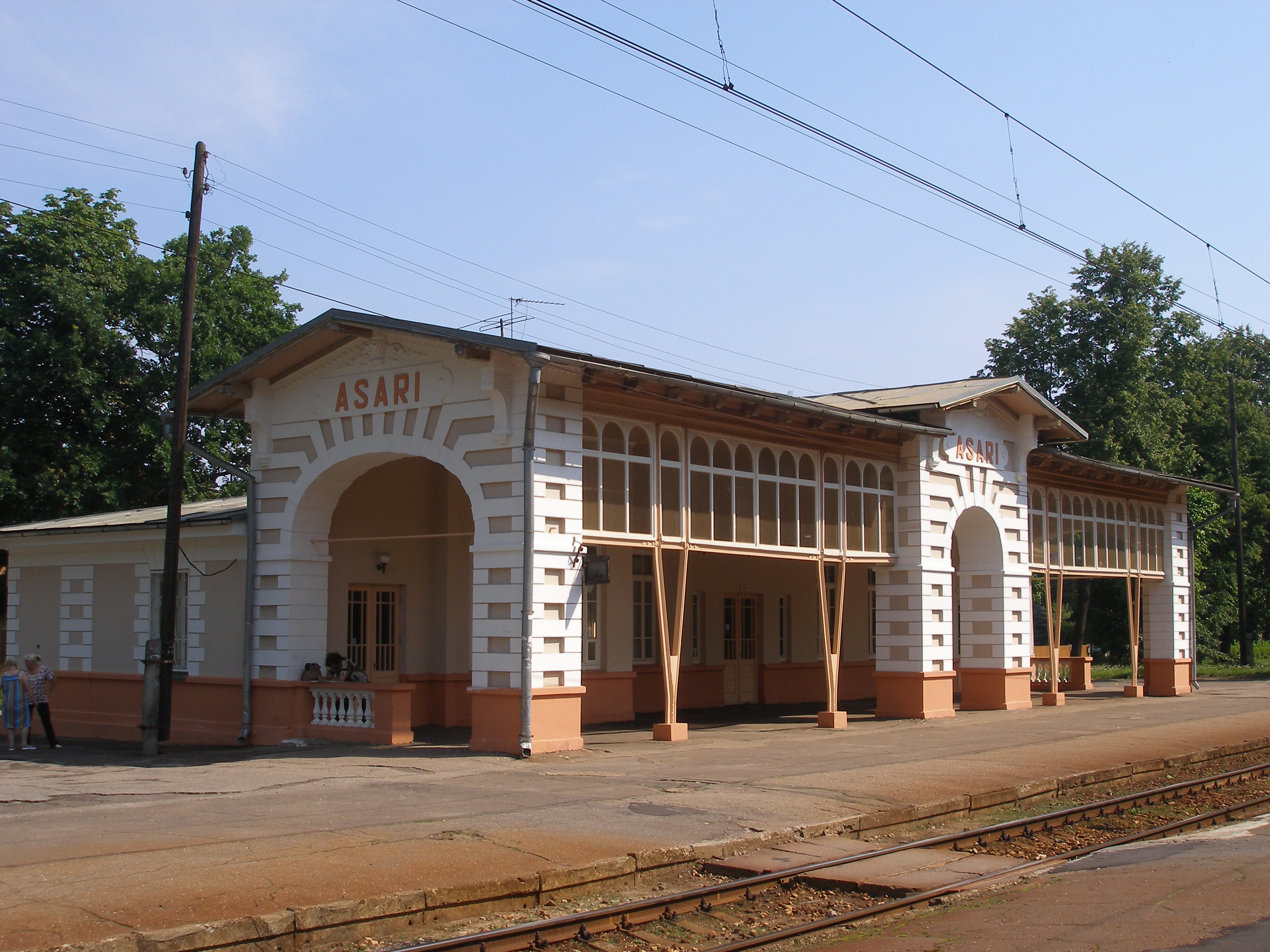

General information
- Location: Asari, Jūrmala; Latvia
- Coordinates: 56°57′25.82″N 23°41′21.91″E

Services
Preceding station	LDz	Following station
Vaivari towards Tukums II	Torņakalns–Tukums II Railway	Melluži towards Riga
Location

Asari Station is a railway station serving the Asari neighbourhood of the city of Jūrmala, Latvia. The station is located on the Torņakalns – Tukums II Railway.
