= Praviņi Station =

Railway station in Latvia

Praviņi
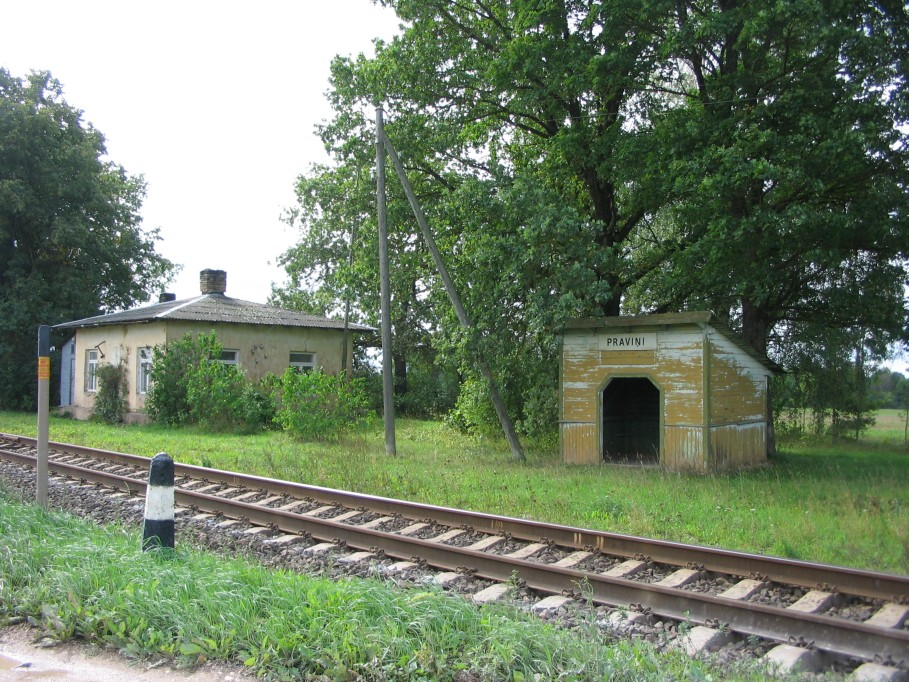

General information
- Location: Latvia
- Coordinates: 56°53′28.73″N 23°14′7.56″E

Services
Preceding station	LDz	Following station
Tukums II Terminus	Tukums II – Jelgava	Slampe towards Jelgava
Location

Praviņi Station is a railway station on the Tukums II – Jelgava Railway.
