= Kūdra =

Neighbourhood of Jurmala, Latvia

Coordinates: 56.930°N 23.544°E

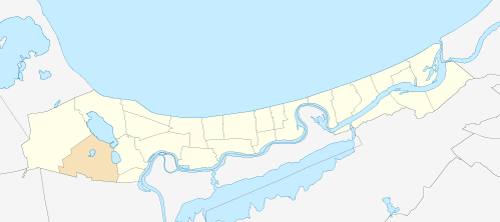
- Location in Jūrmala
- Country: Latvia
- City: Jūrmala

Area
  - Total: 8.7 km^{2} (3.4 sq mi)
- Elevation: 3 m (9.8 ft)

Population (2024)
  - Total: 77
  - Density: 14.1/km^{2} (37/sq mi)

Kūdra is a residential area and neighbourhood of the city Jūrmala, Latvia.

The Kūdra railway station was established in 1951.
