= Kūdra Station =

Railway station in Latvia

Kūdra
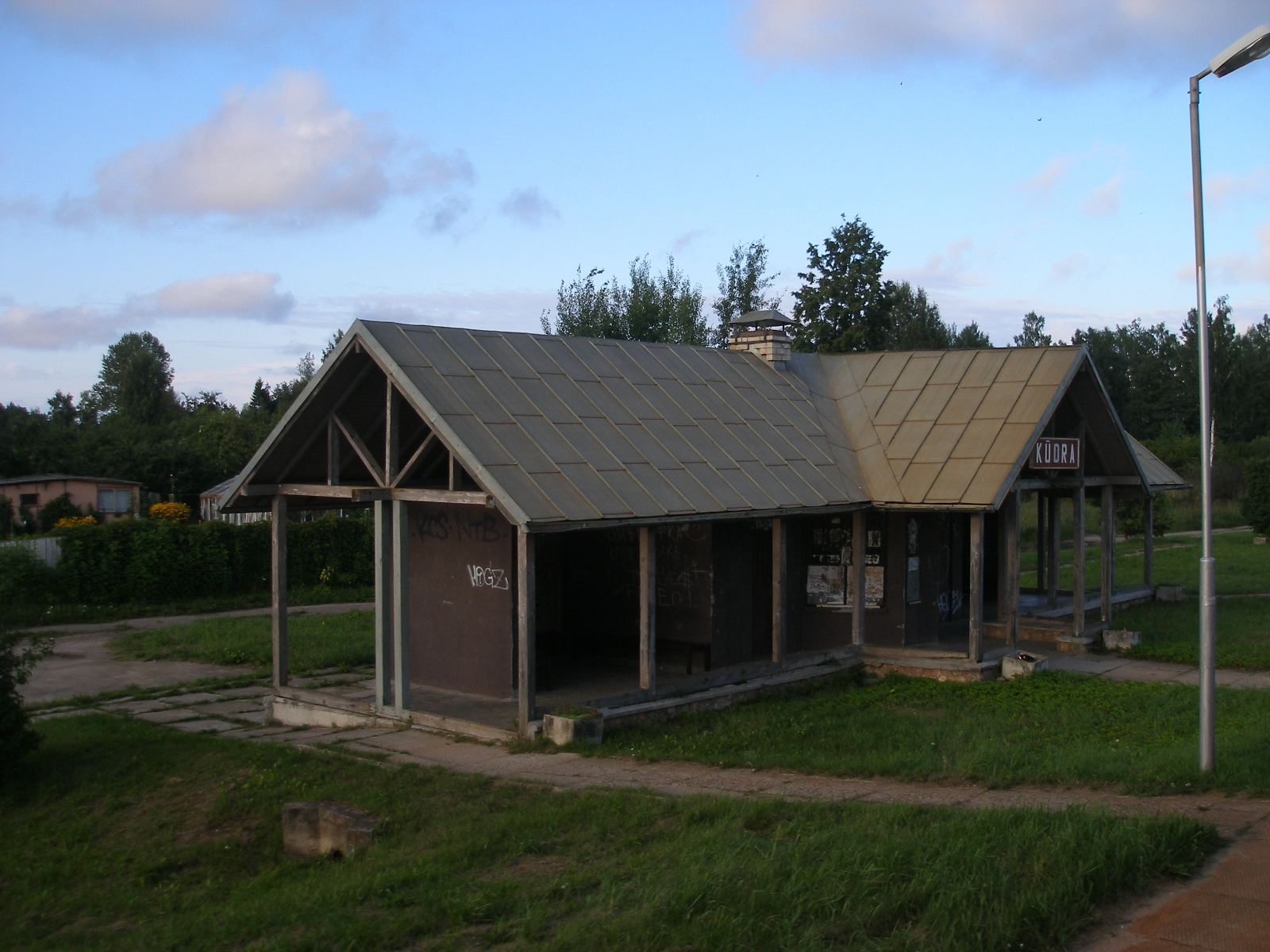

General information
- Location: Kūdra, Jūrmala; Latvia
- Coordinates: 56°55′43.29″N 23°32′45.10″E

Services
Preceding station	LDz	Following station
Kemeri towards Tukums II	Torņakalns–Tukums II Railway	Sloka towards Riga
Location

Kūdra Station is a railway station serving the Kūdra neighbourhood of the city of Jūrmala, Latvia. It is located.on the Torņakalns – Tukums II Railway.
