= Tukums I Station =

Railway station in Tukums, Latvia

Tukums I
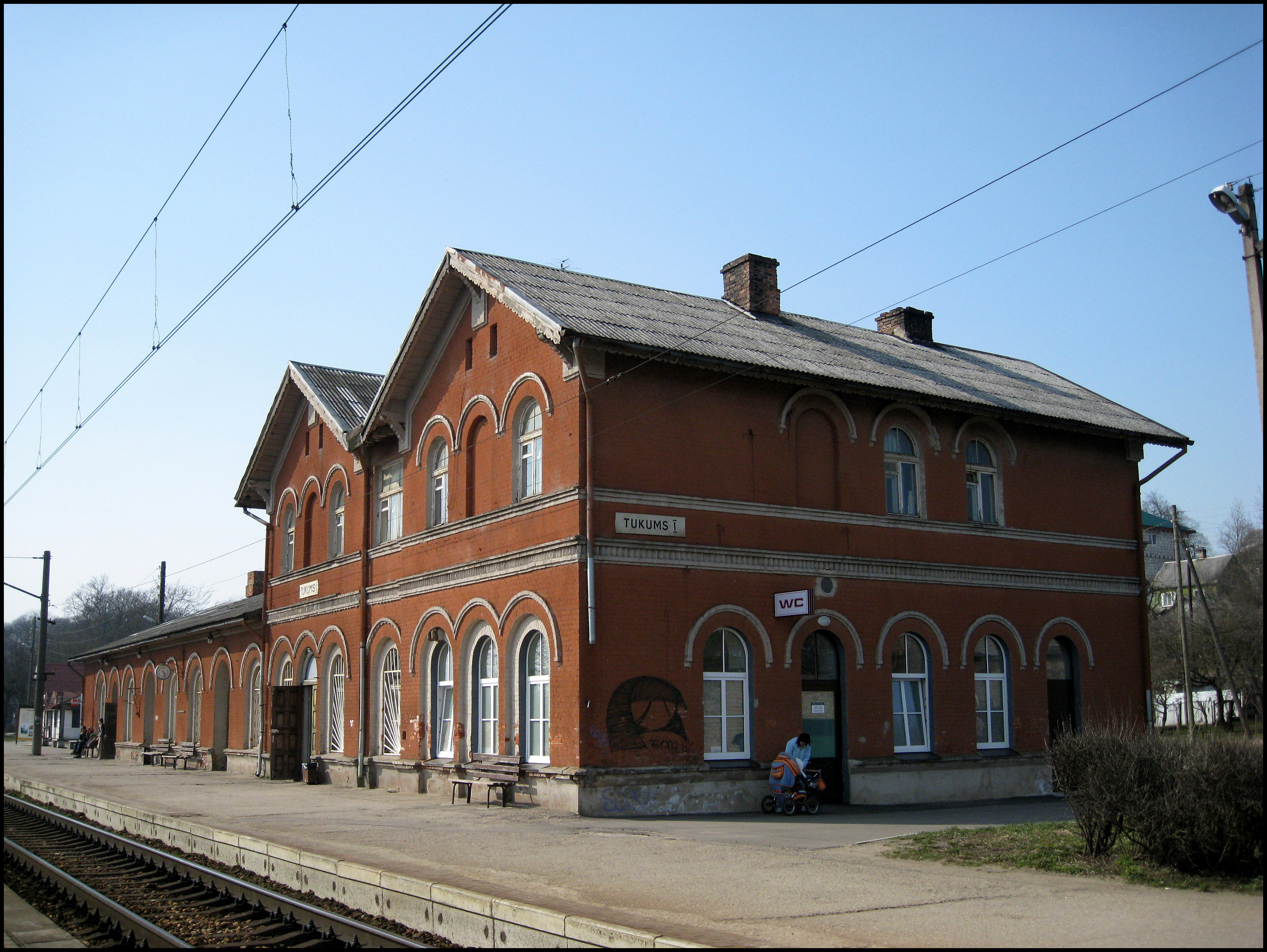

General information
- Location: Dzelzceļa iela 3 Tukums, Tukums Municipality; Latvia
- Coordinates: 56°57′56.64″N 23°10′6.87″E
- Platforms: 2
- Tracks: 3

History
- Opened: 1877

Services
Preceding station	LDz	Following station
Tukums II Terminus	Torņakalns–Tukums II Railway	Milzkalne towards Riga
Location

Tukums I Station is a railway station serving the eastern part of the town of Tukums in the Courland region of western Latvia. It is one of two railway stations in the town, the other being Tukums II in the western part of the town.

The station is located on the Torņakalns – Tukums II Railway.
