= Cinevilla =

Cinema-purposed area in Tukums Municipality, Latvia

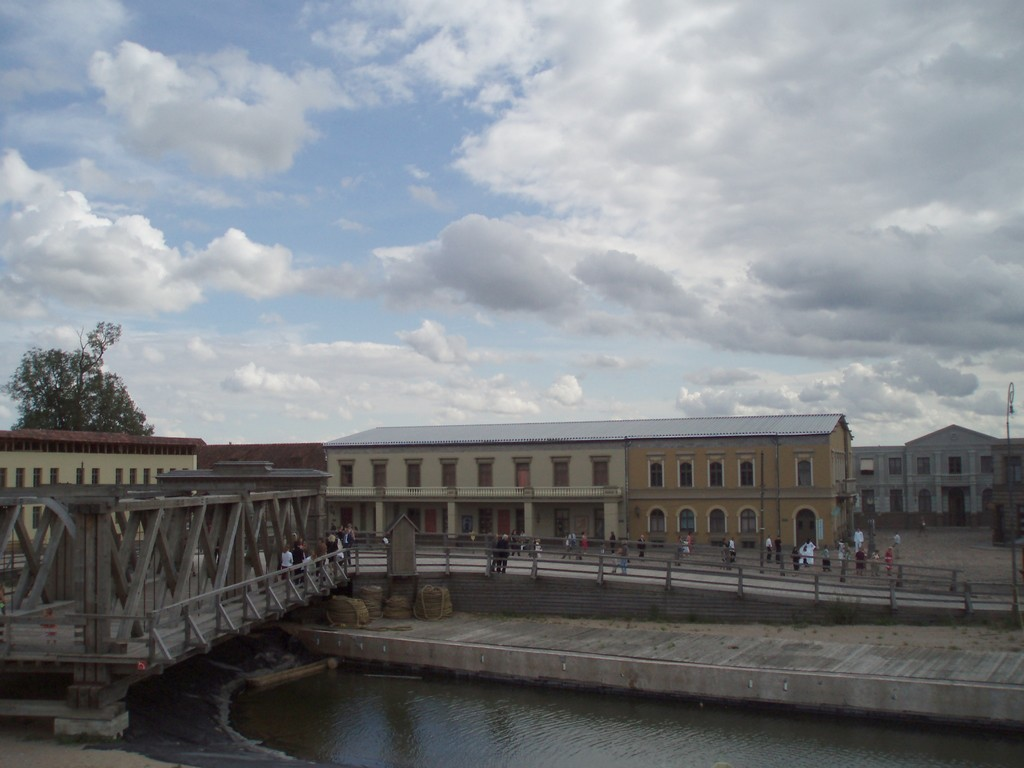
- View of Cinevilla
- Interactive map of Cinevilla
- Location: Slampe Parish, Tukums Municipality, Latvia
- Coordinates: 56.879°N 23.221°E
- Status: Operating
- Opened: 2004
- Owner: Andrejs Ēķis
- Theme: Backlot and film studio
- Area: 150 ha (370 acres)
- Website: cinevillastudios.com

Cinevilla is a backlot and film studio located in Slampe parish, Tukums Municipality, Latvia. Originally created for the outdoor filming of the historical feature film Defenders of Riga, it has since evolved into one of Northern Europe's largest outdoor backlots and a film production facility.

The backlot consists of several sections, including areas with village architecture, prehistoric dwellings and city streets featuring replicas of historical buildings and structures from Riga. It also includes a small canal designed to resemble the Daugava river quays of Riga's Old Town, as well as replicas of the Stone Bridge, the historical Lübeck and the Pontoon bridge.

Among its historical sets are reconstructions of early 20th-century Riga, including riverfront promenades, marketplaces, boat piers and the wooden architecture of Pārdaugava, as well as a 13th-century Semigallian settlement with a castle, harbour, ships and Viking-style buildings.

Cinevilla has served as the filming location for numerous Latvian and international productions, including Blizzard of Souls, Rudolf's Gold, and the historical drama series Sisi. In addition to film and television production, the site hosts festivals, concerts, sporting events, corporate functions and private events when not in use for filming.

Cinevilla is now a major tourist attraction.
