= Ventspils I Station =

Railway station in Latvia

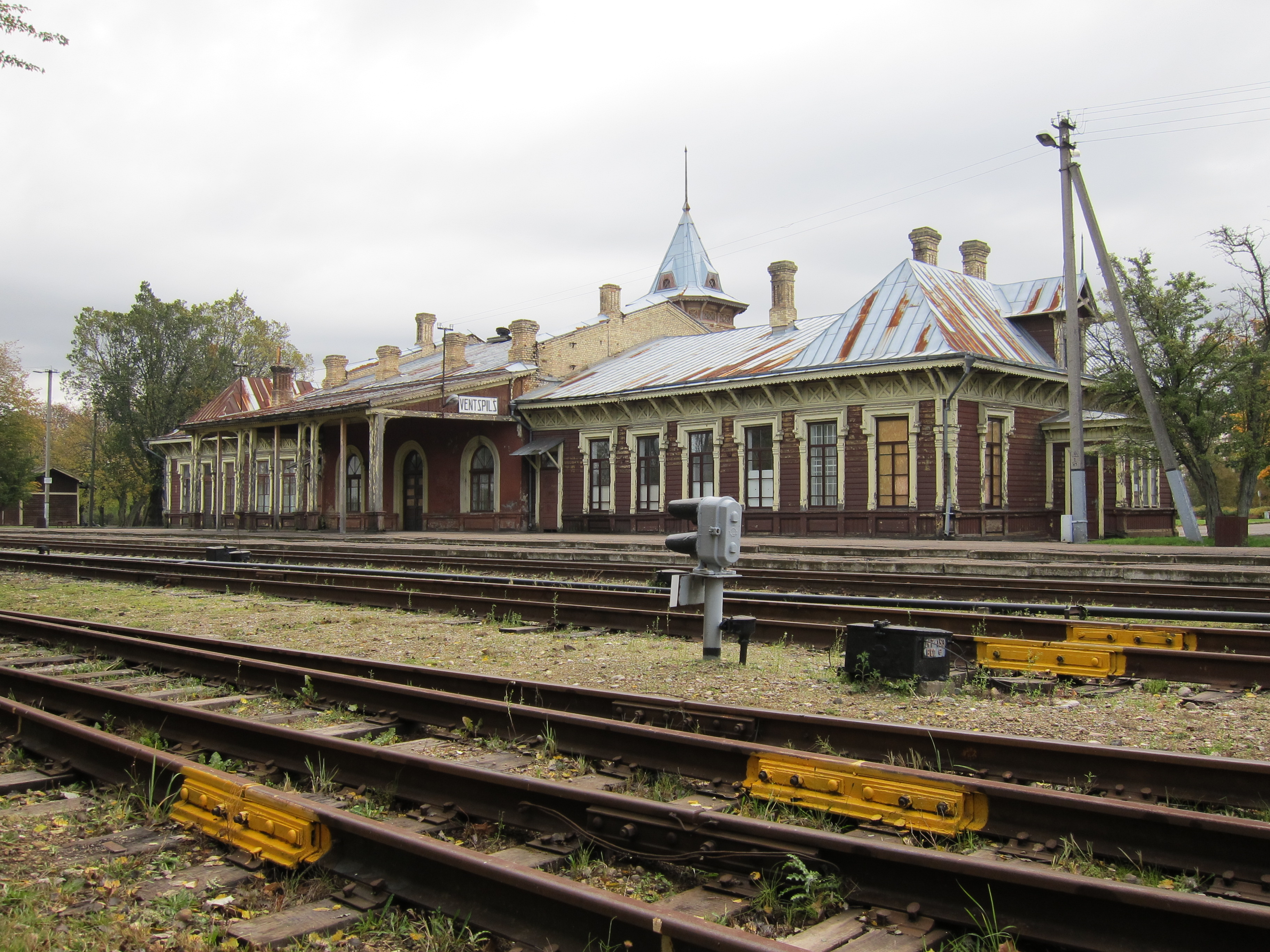
- Station building

General information
- Coordinates: 57°23′29.99″N 21°35′36.57″E
- Platforms: 2
- Tracks: 5

History
- Opened: 1901
Location

Ventspils I Station is a railway station on the Ventspils I – Tukums II Railway.
