= Sloka, Latvia =

Coordinates: 56°57′N 23°37′E

Sloka
- neighbourhood
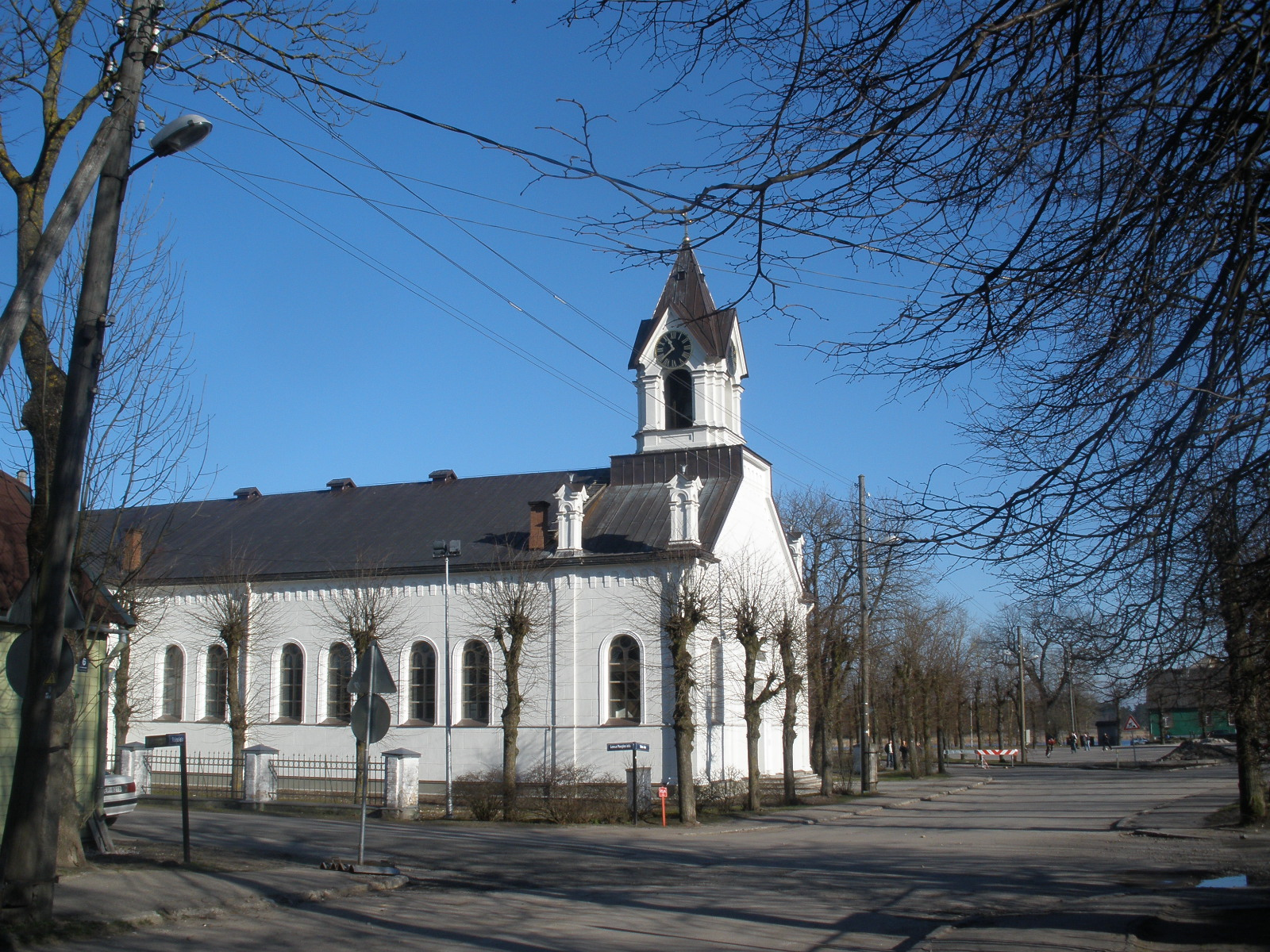
- Sloka's church

- Coat of arms

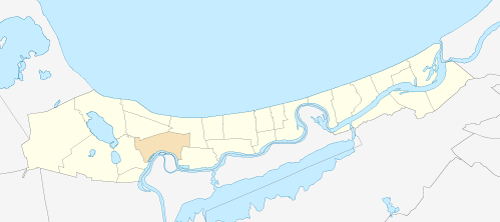
- Location in Jūrmala
- Country: Latvia
- City: Jūrmala
- First mentioned: 1255
- Town rights: 1785
- City rights: 1878
- Included in Jūrmala: 1959

Area
  - Total: 4.8 km^{2} (1.9 sq mi)
- Elevation: 3 m (9.8 ft)

Population (2008)
  - Total: 6,013
  - Density: 1,252.7/km^{2} (3,244/sq mi)

Sloka is a residential area and neighbourhood of the city Jūrmala, Latvia.

== History ==
Sloka is first mentioned in historical records in 1255 under the names Slock and Schlocken. It developed as a fishing village at the river Slocene under the Livonian Order. During the 17th century the Duke of Courland established lime kilns, copper furnaces and a foundry in Sloka. As part of Courland's estate, the village became Lutheran and the first church was built in 1567. The Sloka railway station was established in 1877. Under Russian law, Sloka gained town rights in 1878. It existed as a separate town until 1959 when it was merged with Ķemeri and the Riga district of Jūrmala to form the City of Jūrmala.

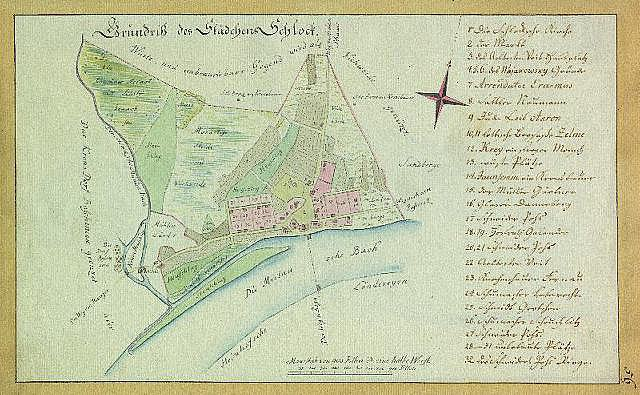
Sloka in the late 18th century. Johann Christoph Brotze.
