= Smārde Parish =

Parish of Latvia

- parish of Latvia
- Coat of arms

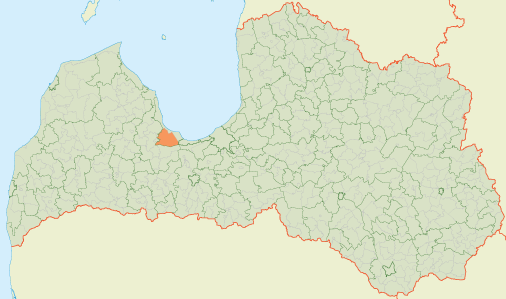
- 56°58′35″N 23°18′24″E

- Location within Latvia
- Country: Latvia

Area
  - Total: 214.72 km^{2} (82.90 sq mi)
  - Land: 209.57 km^{2} (80.92 sq mi)
  - Water: 5.15 km^{2} (1.99 sq mi)

Population (1 January 2026)
  - Total: 2,637
  - Density: 12.58/km^{2} (32.59/sq mi)

Smārde Parish (Latvian: Smārdes pagasts) is an administrative unit of Tukums Municipality in the Courland region of Latvia.
