= Tukums II – Jelgava Railway =

Tukums II–Jelgava Railway
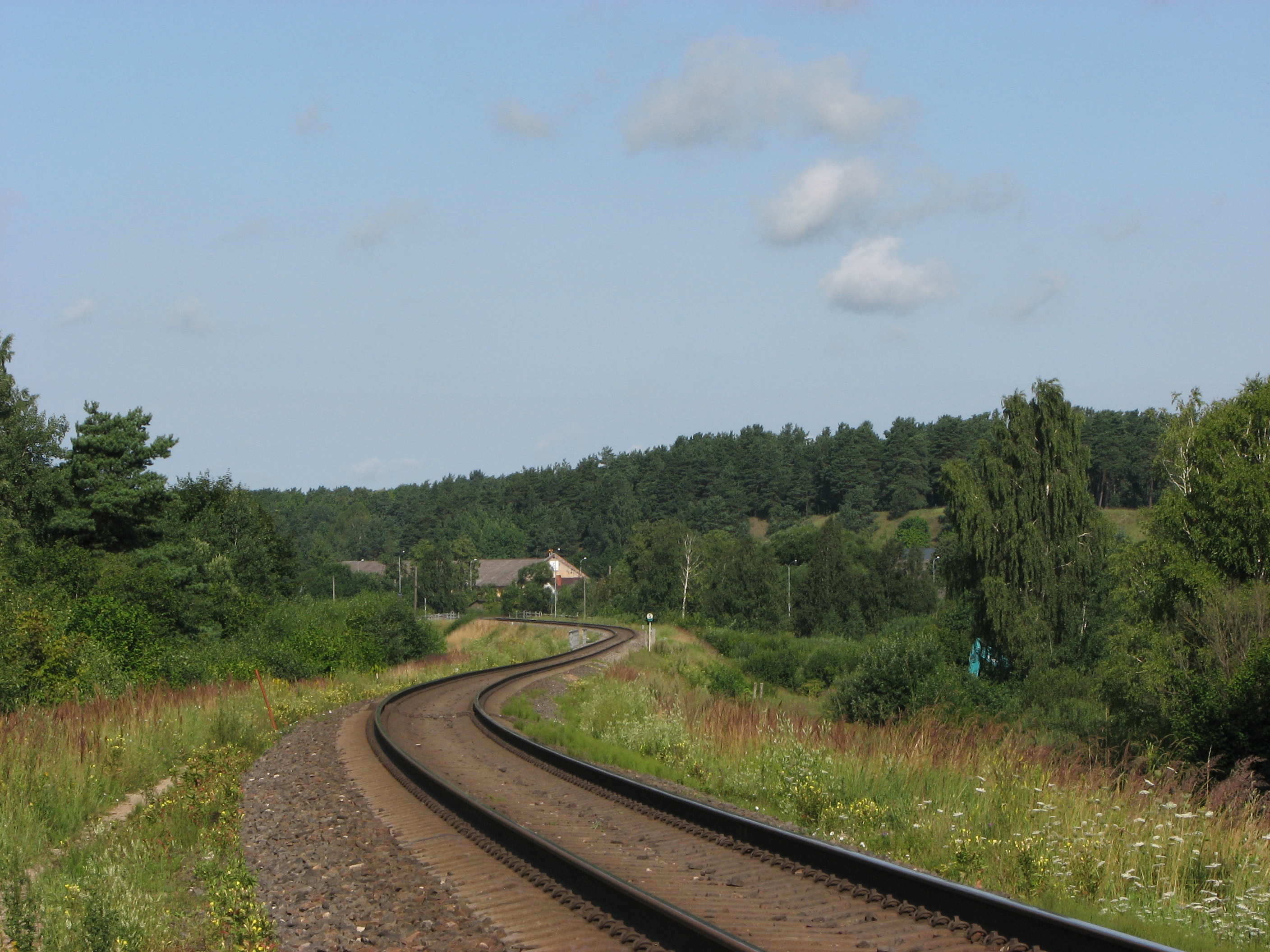

Overview
- Termini: Tukums II Station; Jelgava Station

Service
- Operator(s): Latvian Railways

History
- Opened: 1904

Technical
- Line length: 56 km (34.80 mi)
- Track gauge: 1,524 mm (5 ft)

The Tukums II–Jelgava Railway is a 56 kilometres (35 mi) long, 1,524 mm (5 ft) gauge railway built in the 20th century to connect Tukums and Jelgava.

Railway lines in Latvia in 2016.

== See also ==
- Rail transport in Latvia
- History of rail transport in Latvia

== Bibliography ==
- Altbergs, T.; Augustāne, K.; Pētersone, I. (2009). Dzelzceļi Latvijā [Railways in Latvia] (in Latvian). Jumava. ISBN 978-9984-38-698-0.
