= Ventspils I – Tukums II Railway =

Ventspils I–Tukums II Railway
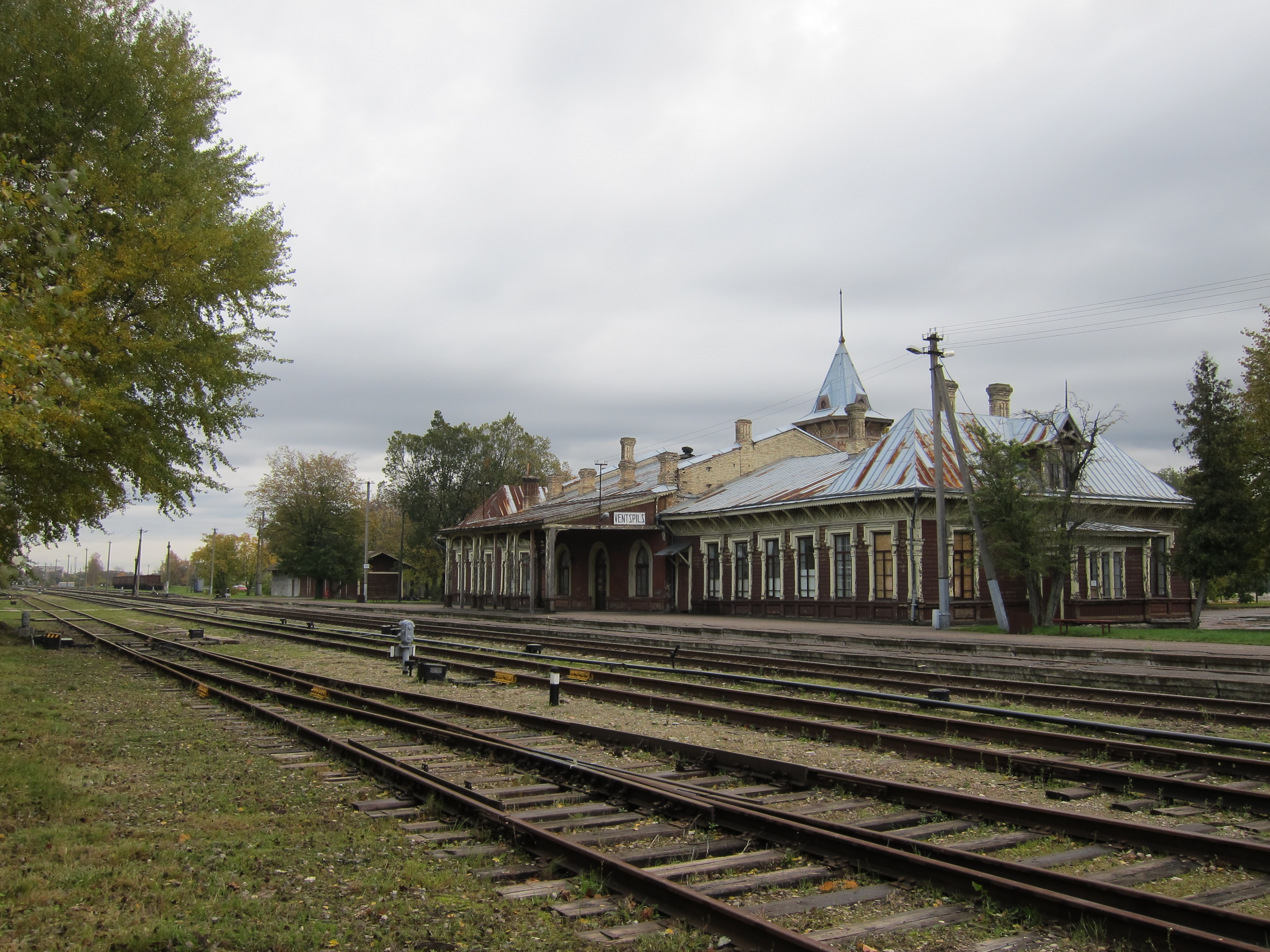
- Ventspils station

Overview
- Termini: Ventspils I Station; Tukums II Station

Service
- Operator(s): Latvian Railways

History
- Opened: 1901

Technical
- Line length: 108 km (67.11 mi)
- Track gauge: 1,524 mm (5 ft)

The Ventspils I–Tukums II Railway is a 108 kilometres (67 mi)-long, 1,524 mm (5 ft)-gauge railway built at the beginning of the 20th century to connect the Latvian towns of Ventspils and Tukums.

Railway lines in Latvia in 2016.

== See also ==
- Rail transport in Latvia
- History of rail transport in Latvia

== Bibliography ==
- Altbergs, T.; Augustāne, K.; Pētersone, I. (2009). Dzelzceļi Latvijā [Railways in Latvia] (in Latvian). Jumava. ISBN 978-9984-38-698-0.
