= Tukums II Station =

Railway station in Tukums, Latvia

Tukums II
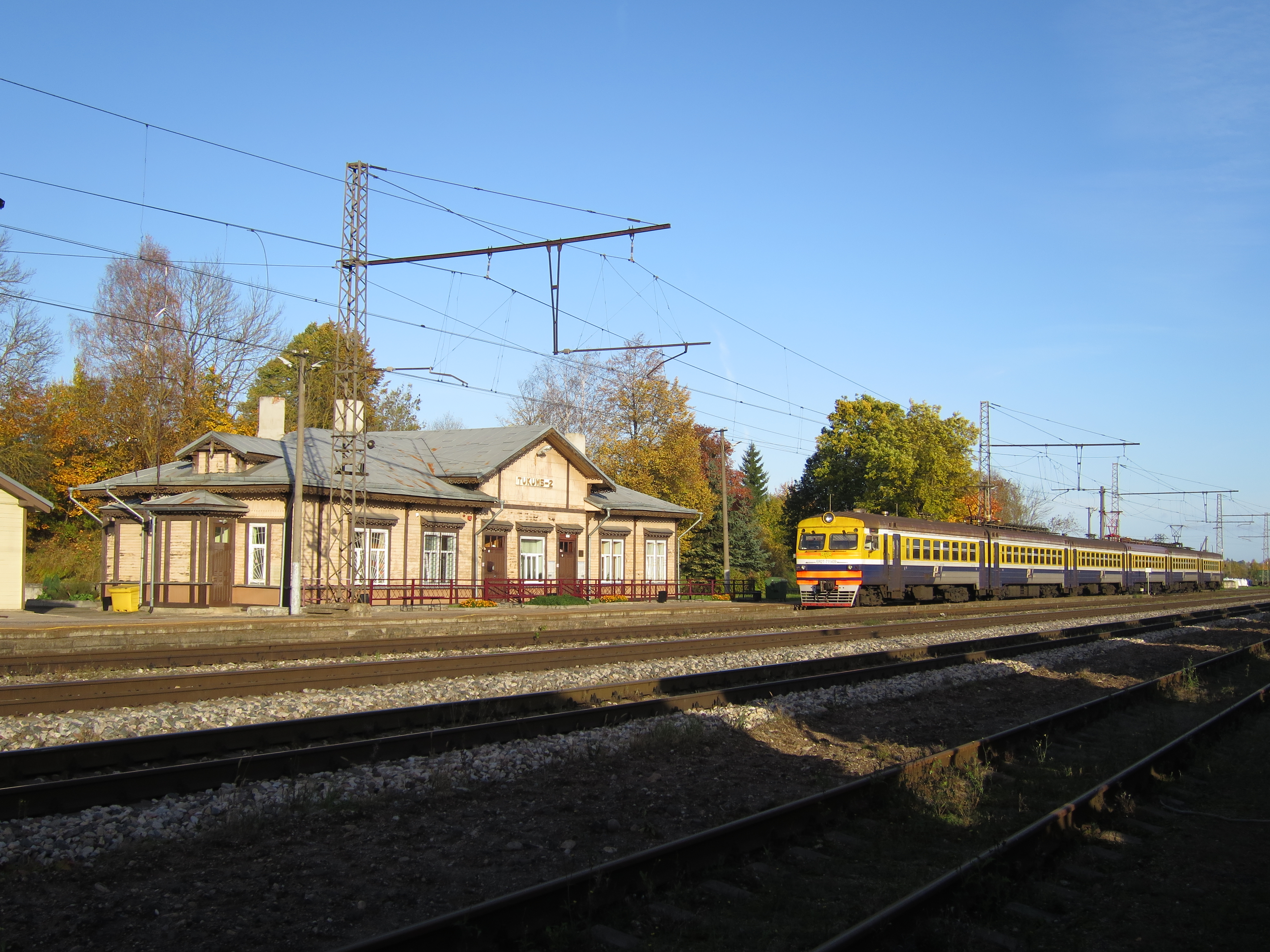

General information
- Location: Stacijas iela 27; Tukums, Tukums Municipality; Latvia
- Coordinates: 56°57′34.84″N 23°6′57.14″E
- Owner: Latvian Railways
- Platforms: 2
- Tracks: 6

History
- Opened: 1904
- Former names: Tuckum-West

Services
Preceding station	LDz	Following station
Terminus	Tukums II – Jelgava	Praviņi towards Jelgava
Terminus	Torņakalns–Tukums II Railway	Tukums I towards Riga
Zvāre towards Ventspils I	Ventspils I – Tukums II	Terminus
Location

Tukums II Station is a railway station serving the western part of the town of Tukums in the Courland region of western Latvia. It is one of two railway stations in the town, the other being Tukums I in the eastern part of the town.

The station is an important railway junction where the Ventspils I – Tukums II, Tukums II – Jelgava and Torņakalns – Tukums II railways all meet.
