= List of botanical gardens in Latvia =

Botanical gardens in Latvia have collections consisting entirely of Latvia native and endemic species; most have a collection that include plants from around the world. There are botanical gardens and arboreta in all states and territories of Latvia, most are administered by local governments, some are privately owned.

- University of Latvia Botanical Garden – Riga
- National Botanic Garden of Latvia – Salaspils
- Kalsnava Arboretum – Kalsnava Parish, Latvia
- Lāčupīte Arboretum, Engure Parish
