= Slocene =

River in Latvia

Coordinates: 57°01′N 23°27′E

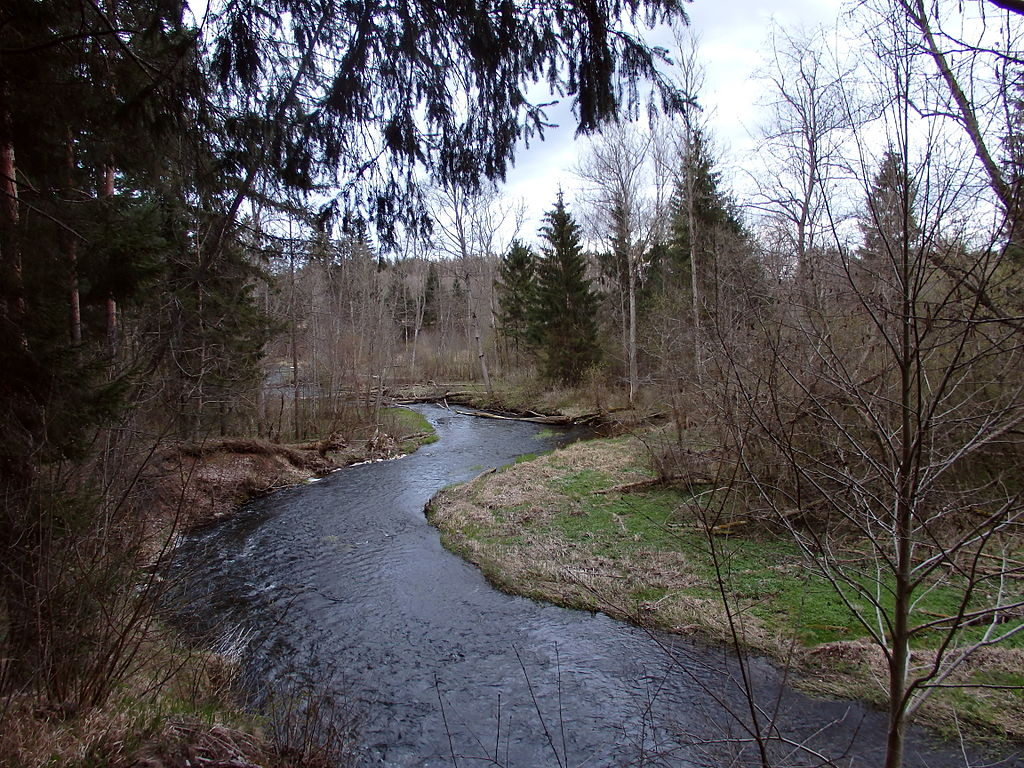
Slocene River near Lake Valgums in Latvia

Slocene is a river in Zemgale, historical region of Latvia. It flows through the Tukums municipality and Engure municipality into the Lake Kaņieris within the territory of the Ķemeri National Park.

== Chemical and ecological status ==
The Slocene River is a moderate-flow upland watercourse in north-western Latvia that extends for roughly 49 km and drains an area of about 242 km². Its basin is underlain by sandy loam soils and lies predominantly over a substrate of sand, gravel and stones. Nearly one third of the catchment is devoted to arable and pastoral farming, while almost half is covered by mixed forests, which together shape both the volume and quality of water entering the river.

Water-quality monitoring between 2007 and 2018 reveals pronounced seasonal swings in nutrient levels. Total nitrogen (TN) concentrations peaked at 21 milligrammes per litre (mg L⁻¹) during spring snowmelt and fell to as low as 0.86 mg L⁻¹ in late autumn. Total phosphorus (TP) similarly rose to about 0.14 mg L⁻¹ in late summer before dropping to around 0.03 mg L⁻¹ in autumn. For comparison, undisturbed surface waters in Latvia typically contain less than 0.5 mg L⁻¹ of TN and under 0.05 mg L⁻¹ of TP, so these elevated values point to significant nutrient inputs—largely from agricultural runoff.

Despite those elevated nutrient loads, the Slocene River is assessed as having a "good" ecological status under Latvia's implementation of the EU Water Framework Directive. This classification reflects not only the degree of diffuse pollution from farmland but also the buffering effect of extensive forest cover. The marked rises in nutrient concentrations during spring and autumn flood periods highlight the need for targeted catchment measures—such as vegetated buffer strips, sedimentation ponds and controlled drainage—to limit further nutrient losses and safeguard the river's ecological health.

Two block-cut peat extraction fields in the adjacent Zalais Bog were drained by ditches leading into the Smirdgrāvis tributary of the Slocene River. These drainage channels remain operative more than fifty years after peat extraction ceased, continuously diverting bog water into the Slocene catchment. Hydrological monitoring reveals that the impact of the abandoned quarries on the surrounding bog extends up to approximately 122 m from the reservoir edges, indicating long-term modifications to local water tables and flow regimes.
