= Lāčupīte Arboretum =

Arboretum in Latvia

Coordinates: 57.050°N 23.341°E

- Lāčupītes dendrārijs
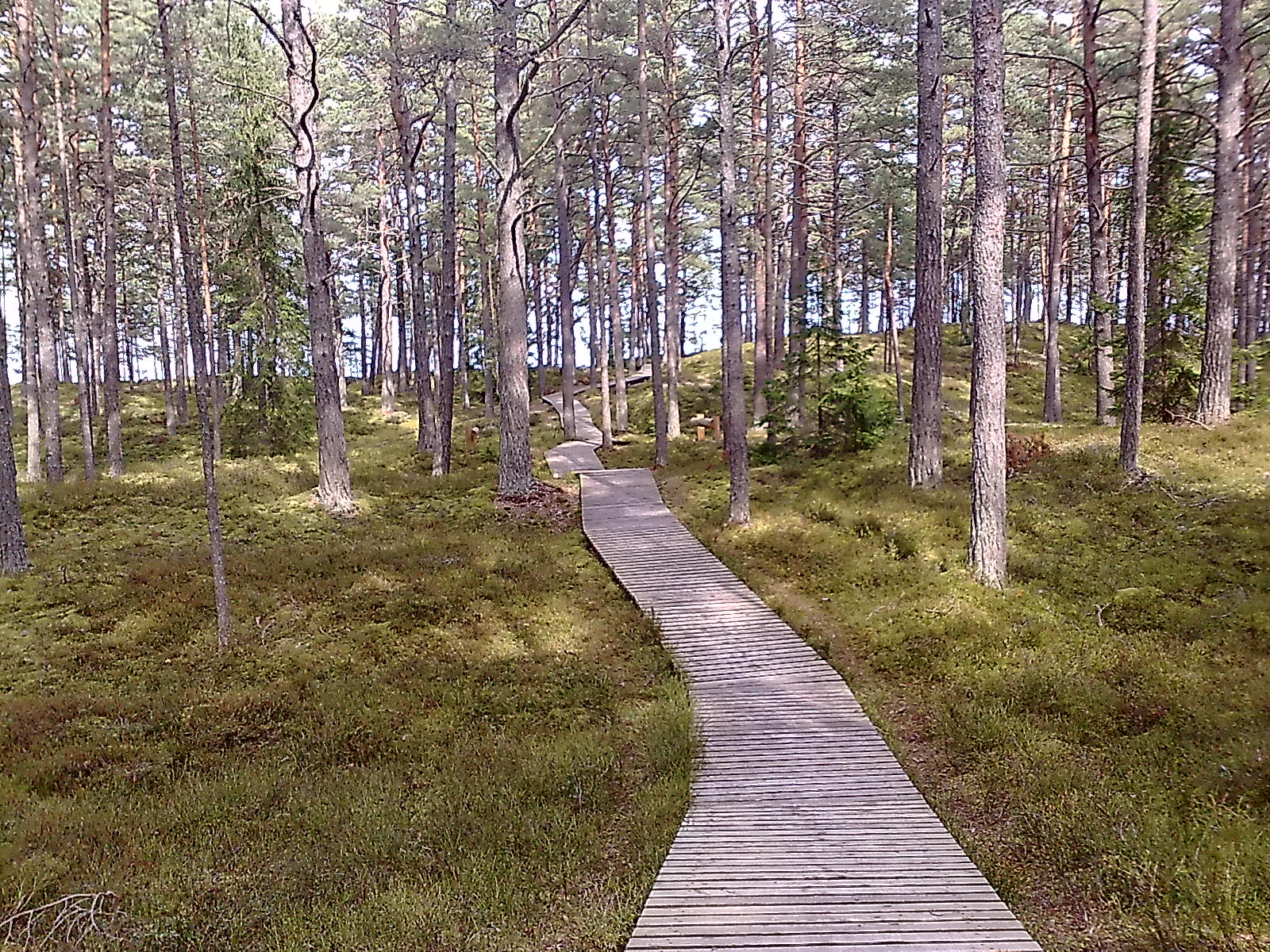
- Boardwalk at the arboretum in 2009
- Type: Arboretum
- Location: Engure Parish, Tukums Municipality, Latvia
- Created: 1959

Lāčupīte Arboretum (Latvian: Lāčupītes dendrārijs) is an arboretum in Tukums Municipality, Latvia, between Apšuciems and Klapkalnciems. It lies beside the Lāčupe river and contains plantings of non-native trees and shrubs within coastal woodland. The site is protected as a natural monument.

== History ==
Planting began in 1959 on state forest land near the coast. Civil engineer Igors Mednis developed the collection to study how introduced trees and shrubs adapted to local conditions and interacted with native habitats.

The first planting was a walnut obtained from the garden of sculptor Kārlis Zemdega. The collection was expanded with seeds and seedlings from Latvia and abroad. Mednis obtained material during his travels and through seed exchange, and worked with the Latvian Dendrological Society and the National Botanic Garden of Latvia.

In 2001, Latvia's Cabinet of Ministers designated the plantings a protected natural monument.

== Collection ==
The collection includes Lawson's cypress, Japanese cedar, yews, maples and walnuts, as well as rhododendrons. Some introduced species reproduce naturally within the woodland. A nature trail provides access to the plantings.
