= Engure =

Village in Latvia

- Village
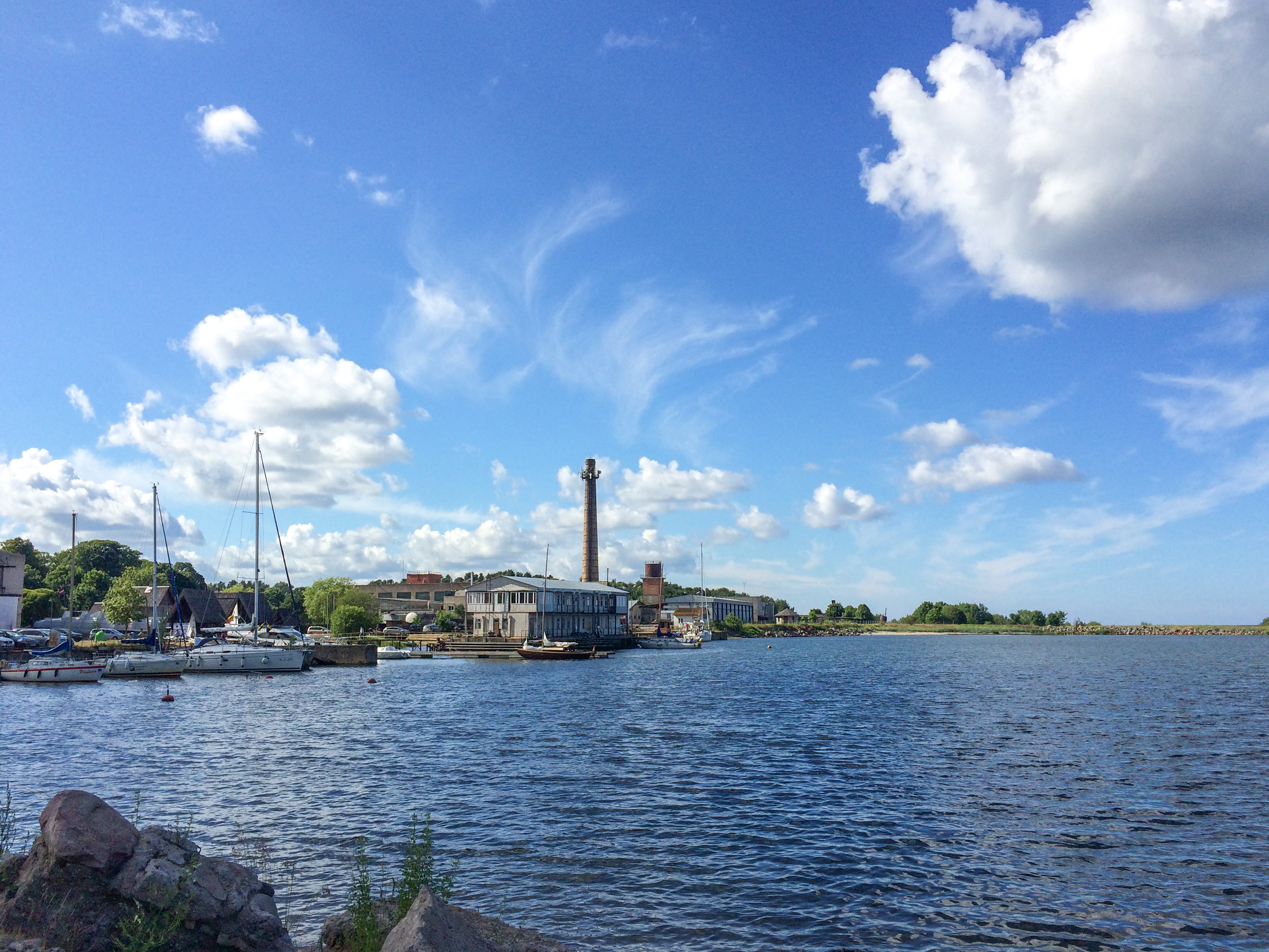
- Port of Engure

- Engures' location in Latvia
- Coordinates: 57°9′38.55″N 23°13′28.72″E
- Country: Latvia
- Municipality: Tukums
- Parish: Engure

Population (2013)
  - Total: 1,572

Engure is a village in Engure Parish, in the northern part of Tukums municipality in the Courland region of Latvia, at the sea shore of the Gulf of Riga. Engure is also the centre of Engure parish. It extends 43.5KM from Klapkalnciems to Mērsrags. As of 2021 the population of Engure was 1,343. The male population was 637 while the female was 706.
