= Maija Bice =

Latvian dendrologist, horticulturist, and plant introduction specialist

- Born: Riga, Latvia
- Died: Ogre, Latvia
- Education: Latvia University of Agriculture, Faculty of Agronomy
- Scientific career
- Fields: botany, dendrology, horticulture
- Workplaces: University of Latvia Botanical Garden, National Botanical Garden, National Botanical Garden's Dendroflora Department

Maija Bice (1939–2008) was a Latvian dendrologist, horticulturist, and plant introduction specialist. She was the head and creator of the National Botanical Garden (NBG) arboretum, a researcher of Latvian and Baltic dendroflora, and the head of the National Botanical Garden's Dendroflora Department (2006–2008).

== Biography ==
Maija Bice was born on May 13, 1939, in Riga. From 1946 to 1957, she studied at Koknese Secondary School. After graduating from high school, she enrolled at the Faculty of Agronomy of the Latvia University of Agriculture. From 1961 to 1963, she switched to part-time studies, specializing in horticulture.

In 1961, she started working as a laborer at the National Botanical Garden. After graduating from university in 1963, she moved to work at the University of Latvia Botanical Garden. She worked as a senior laboratory technician and research associate. From 1973 to 1974, she was a junior research associate at the Plant Physiology Development Research Problems Laboratory.

In 1974, M. Bice returned to the National Botanical Garden, working as an agronomist and senior agronomist. In 1986, she was elected as a junior research associate in the Dendroflora Department, which was led by Raimonds Cinovskis. From 2006 to 2008, she served as the department head.

Maija Bice died on May 17, 2008, in Ogre, and was buried in Ogre Forest Cemetery.

== Scientific work ==
At the University of Latvia Botanical Garden, Maija Bice was involved in the acclimatization of low and ground-cover shrubs.

In 1975, Maija Bice took over the management of the National Botanical Garden's Dendroflora Department. One of the methods for introducing woody plants was ecological acclimatization. In 1986, work began on creating a new dendroflora area, where plants are arranged by origin — America, China, the Far East, etc., strictly adhering to ecological requirements. The responsibilities of the arboretum manager included organizing work, conducting inventory of plantings, compiling and maintaining their list, and preparing the arboretum plan. She was also responsible for public engagement and training student groups.

Since 1973, Maija Bice participated in the inventory of parks, avenues, and other dendrological objects organized by the National Botanical Garden. Park surveys, protection, and management measures have been a significant part of the scientist's professional activities. The results of these inventories were used to compile lists of specially protected dendrological objects.

M. Bice was also involved in identifying and collecting materials on Latvian and Baltic, including Kaliningrad region dendroflora. She participated in long-distance expeditions of the Dendroflora Laboratory to former USSR territories including the Far East, Central Asia, Caucasus, Black Sea coast, Crimea, etc.

Member and one of the founders of the Latvian Dendrologists' Association. M. Bice's collected herbarium is stored at the National Botanical Garden herbarium (international code HBA).

== Recognition ==
- In 2010, received recognition from the Latvian Academy of Sciences for preparing the "Atlas of Latvian Woody Plants."

== Works ==
Maija Bice is the author and co-author of more than 50 scientific and popular science publications. Only those where M. Bice is the sole author and major monographs are listed here. More can be found in the article about Dzintra Knape.

- Bice M. 1972. Results of the introduction of decorative low-growing and spreading shrubs in the Botanical Garden of LGS named after P. Stucki. Introduction and selection of plants. Proceedings of the Botanical Garden of LGS named after P. Stucki. Riga, 18:37-57.
- Bice M. 1977. A summary of low ground-cover woody plants introduced in Latvia. Ornamental Horticulture 11:19-30.
- Bice M. 1977. Species and hybrids of the genus Spiraea (Spiraea L.) section Spiraea (Spiraria Ser. In DC.), cultivated in the Latvian SSR. Botanical Gardens of the Baltic States. Plant Protection. Zinātne, Riga, pp. 197-208.
- Bice M. 1981. Spireas. Garden and Drava 2:20-24.
- Bice M. 1986. Ericaceae family low shrubs. Ornamental Horticulture 13:4-20.
- Cinovskis R., Bice M., Knape Dz., Šmite D. 1986. Latvian dendrological values. Zinātne, Riga, 343 pp.
- Laiviņš M., Bice M., Krampis I., Knape Dz., Šmite D., Šulcs V. 2009. Atlas of Latvian Woody Plants. LU Biology Institute. Riga, SIA Apgāds Mantojums, 606 pp.

== Sources ==
- National Botanical Garden archive. Maija Bice's personnel file.
- Knape Dz. Raimonds Cinovskis (1930–1998). List of Published Works. Latvian Vegetation, No.7. 2014. http://botany.lv/wp-content/uploads/2014/10/Vegetacija_6.pdf
