= Ragaciems =

Village in Latvia

- Large village
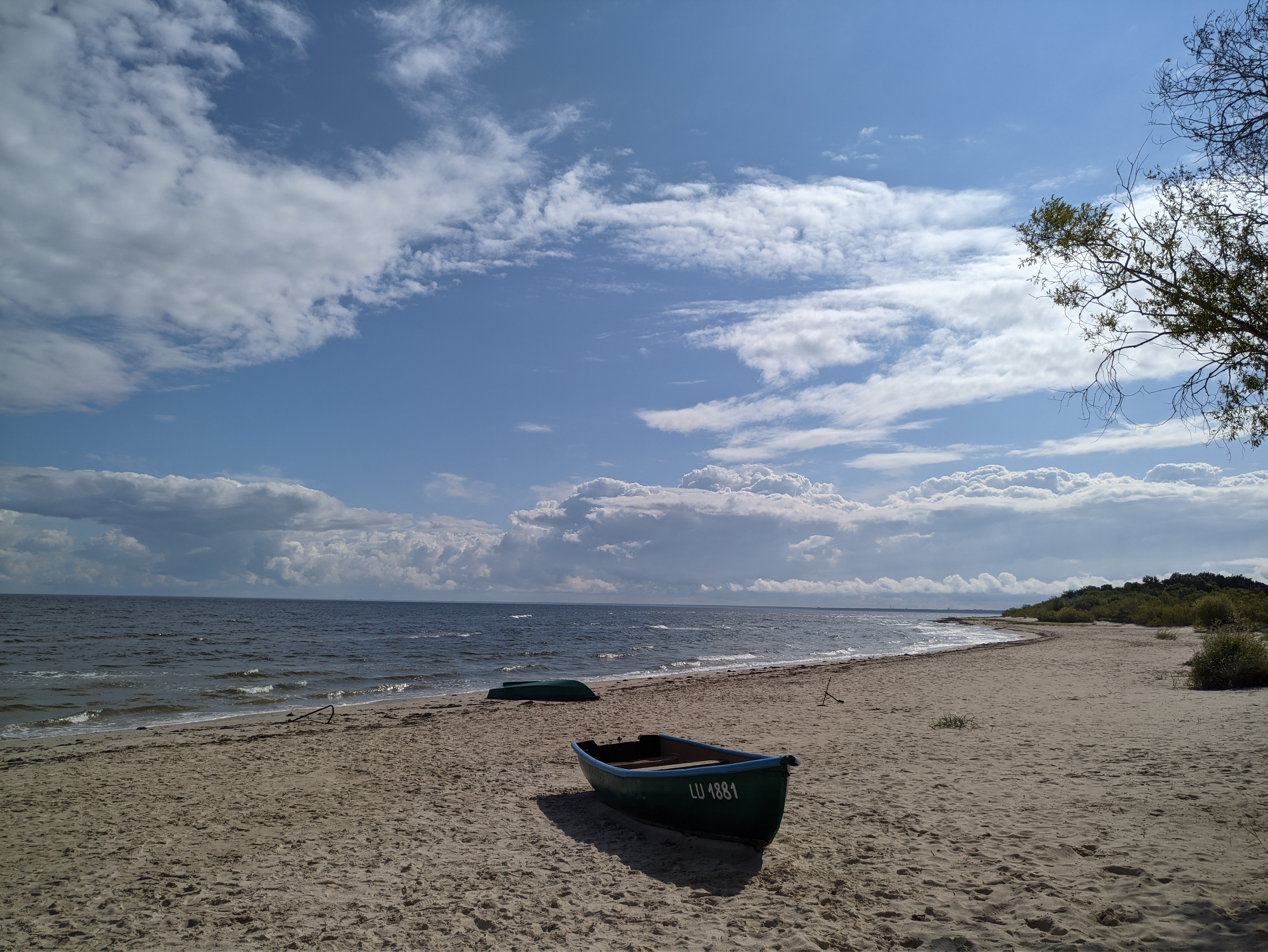
- Ragaciems beach

- Ragaciems location in Latvia
- Coordinates: 57°1′27″N 23°29′30″E
- Country: Latvia
- Municipality: Tukums
- Parish: Lapmežciems

Population (2021)
  - Total: 576

Ragaciems is a village in Lapmežciems parish, Tukums municipality, south of Ragaciems cape in the Vidzeme region of Latvia. The village got its name from the nearby cape. Located between the Gulf of Riga and Lake Kaņieris by the highway P128, 3 km from the center of the parish Lapmežciems, 23 km from the center of the county Smarde and 52 km from Riga.

== Gallery ==
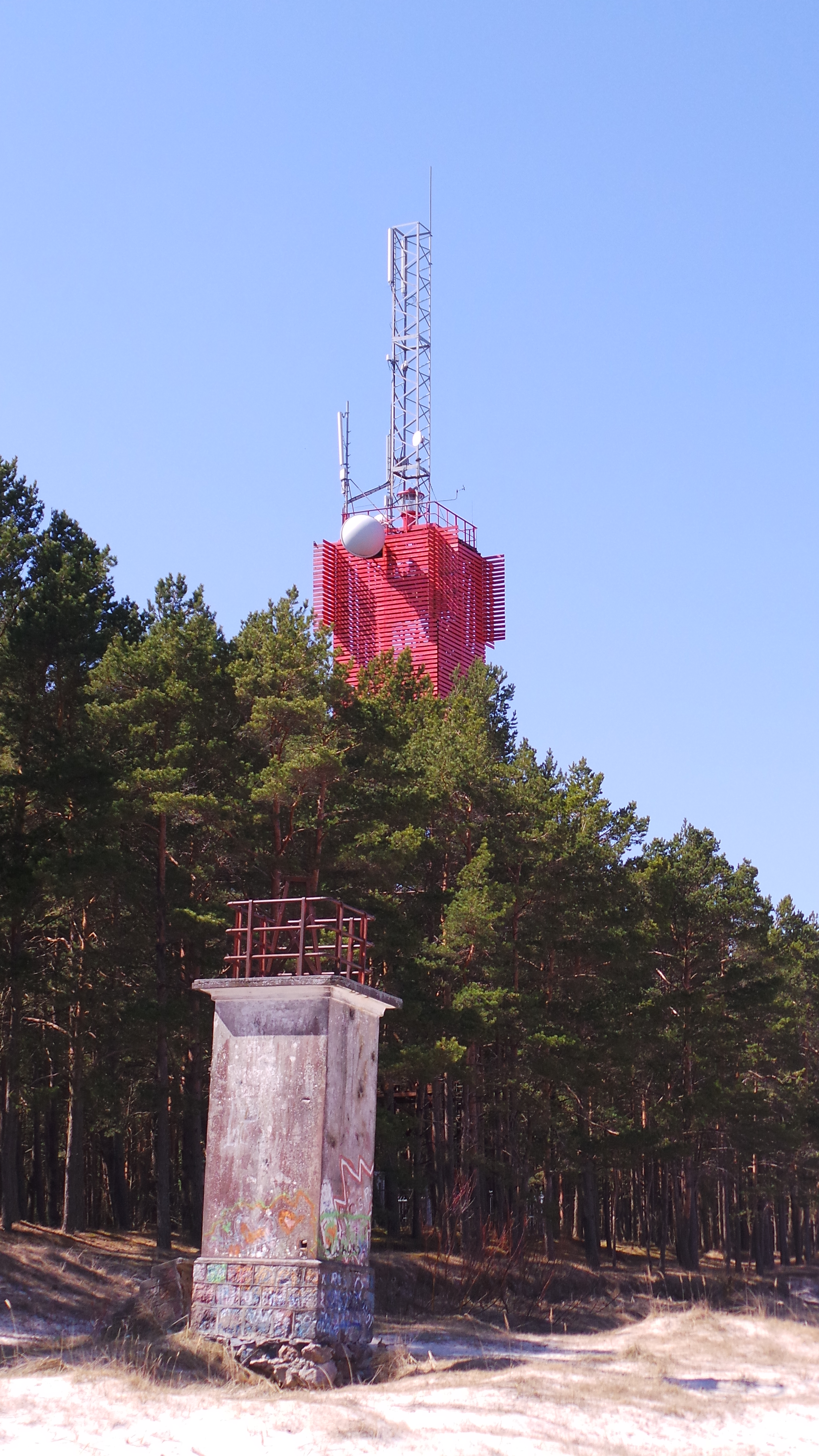
Ragaciems old and new lighthouse

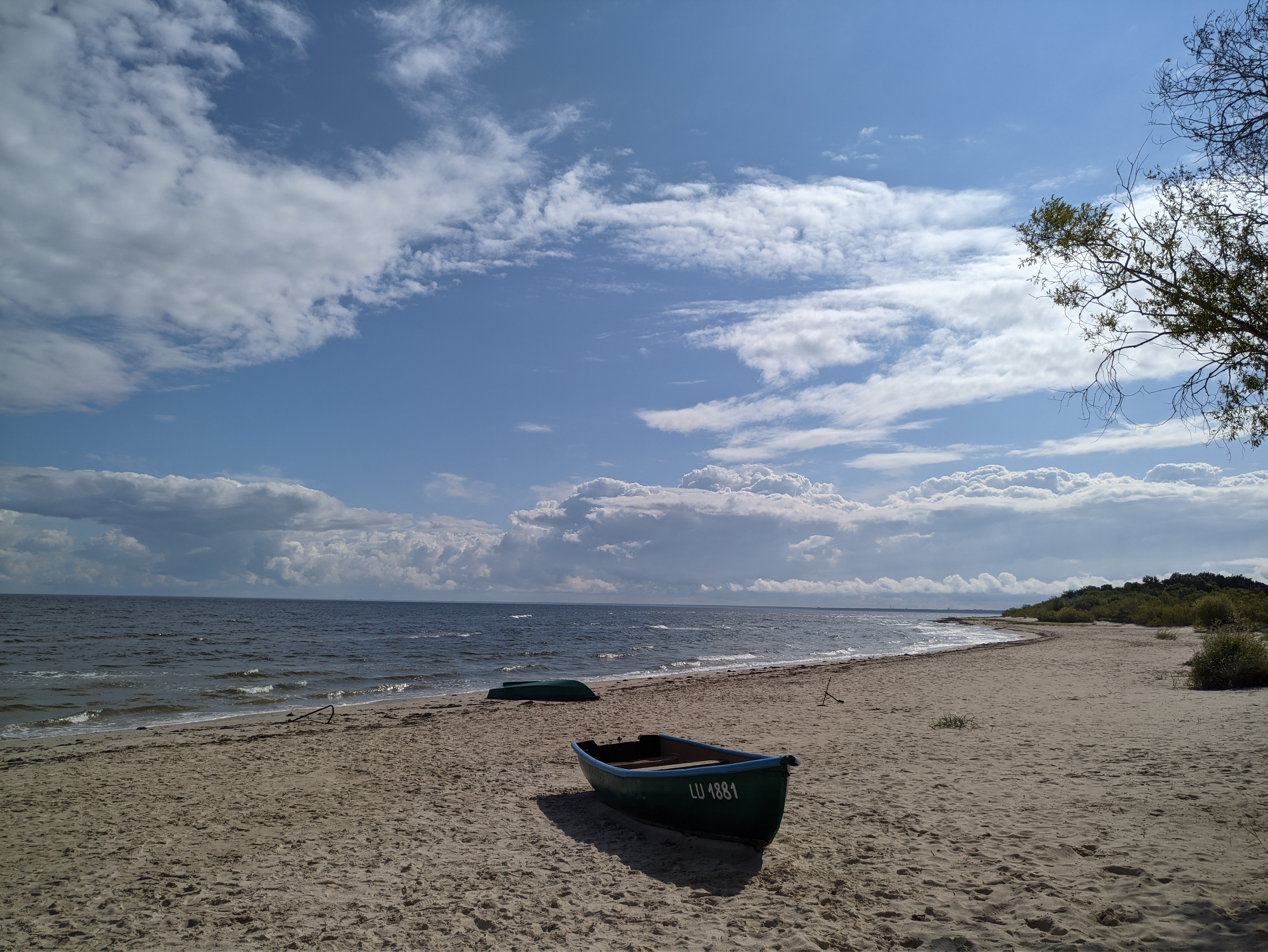
Ragaciems beach

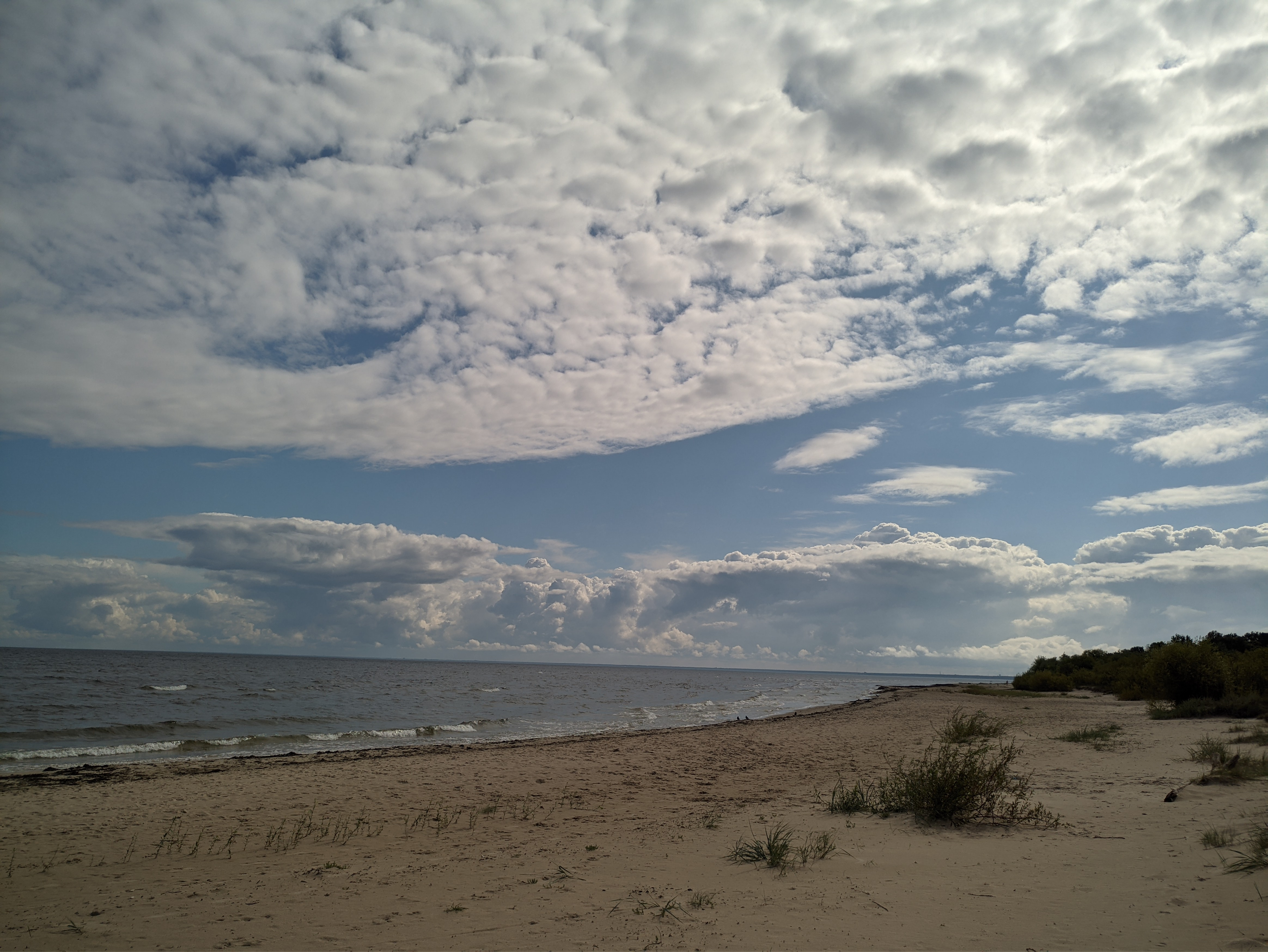

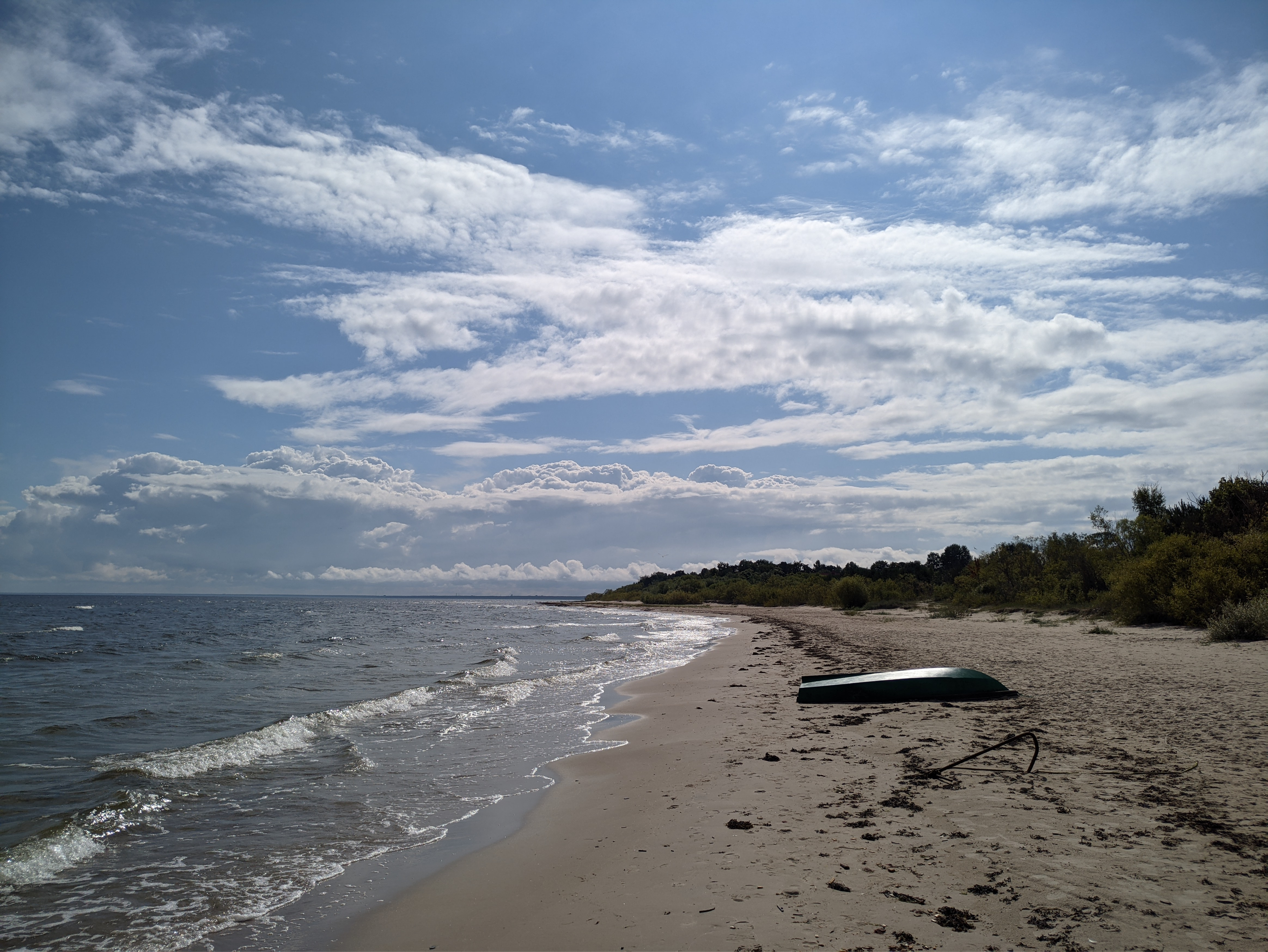

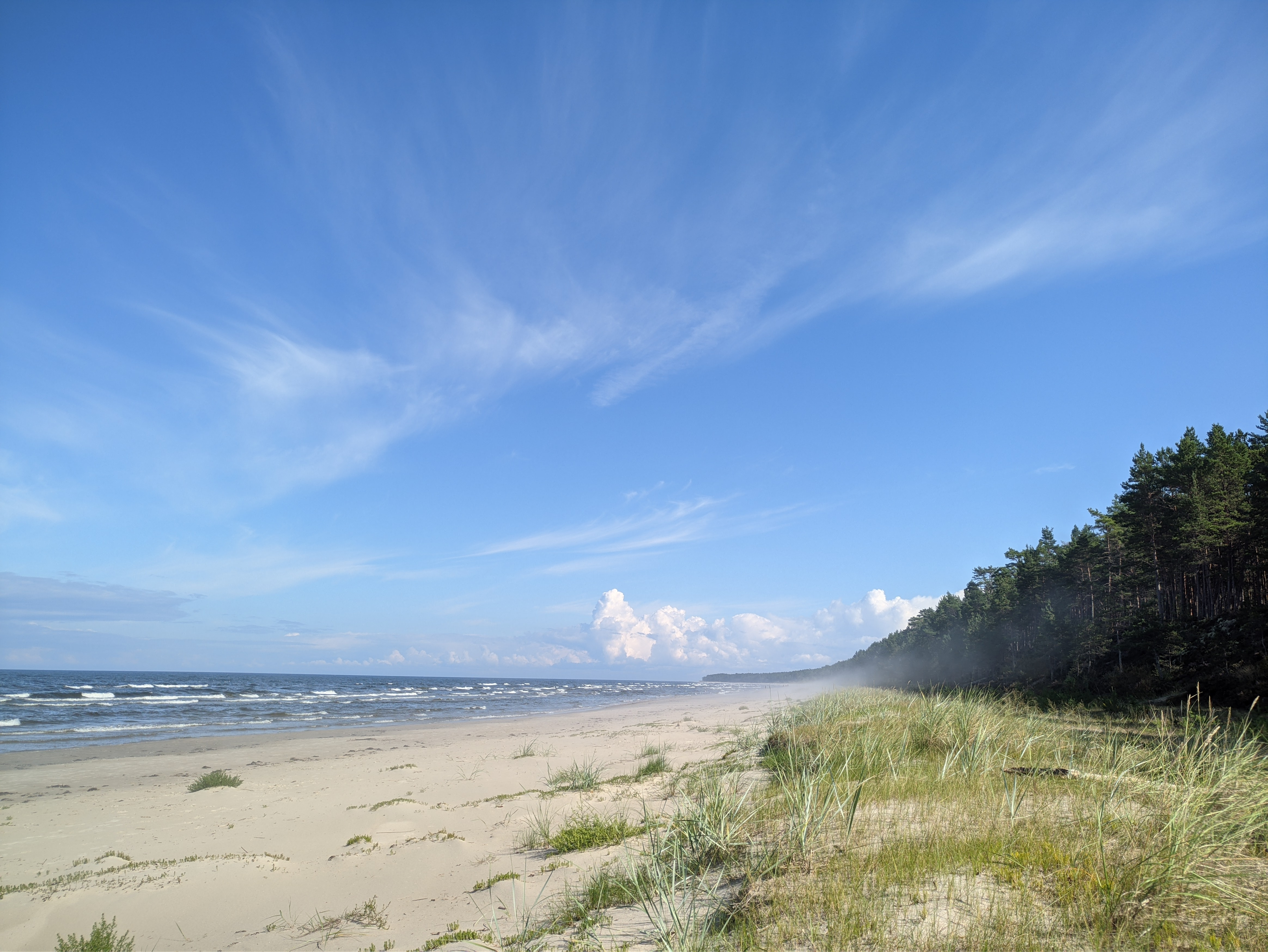
Beach 'Slow mile' between Ragaciems and Klapkalnciems. In the distance is visible Ragaciems cape.

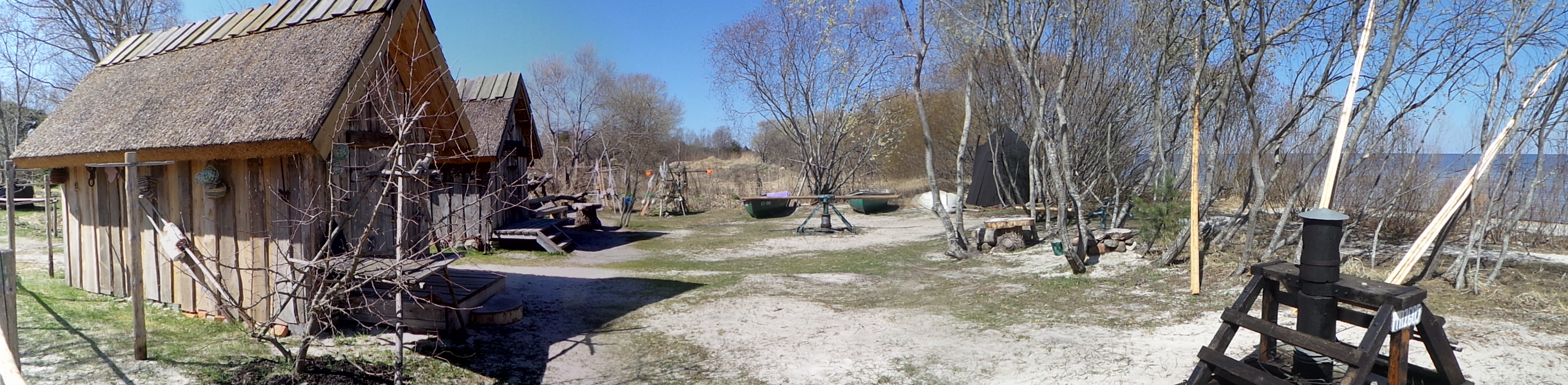
Ragaciems old fisherman's villages
