= Lake Kaņieris =

Lake in Ķemeri National Park, Latvia

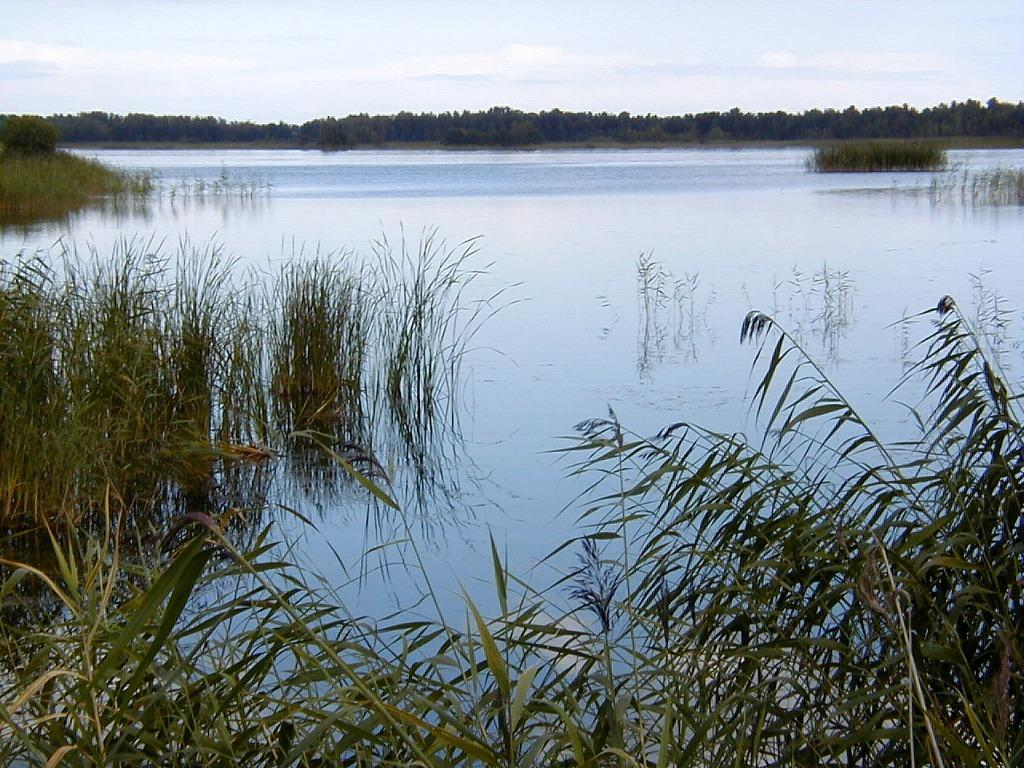
- Lake Kaņieris near Lapmežciems

- Location within Latvia
- Coordinates: 57°00′N 023°26′E
- Lake type: Lagoon lake
- Primary inflows: Slocene
- Primary outflows: Starpiņupīte
- Basin countries: Latvia
- Max. length: 5.2 km (3.2 mi)
- Surface area: 11.28 km^{2} (4.36 sq mi)
- Average depth: 0.6 m (2.0 ft)
- Max. depth: 1.8 m (5.9 ft)
- Surface elevation: 2.2 m (7 ft 3 in)
- Islands: 14
- Settlements: Lapmežciems, Ragaciems, Antiņciems

Ramsar Wetland
- Official name: Lake Kanieris
- Designated: 25 July 1995
- Reference no.: 739

Kaņieris Lake or Lake Kaņieris is a lake in Latvia located in the Ķemeri National Park west of the city of Jūrmala. Lake is located in Engure Municipality, main part of it in Lapmežciems Parish and a smaller part in Smārde Parish. Since 1995 Lake Kaņieris is designated a Ramsar wetland of international importance.

== Geography ==
lake is a former lagoon of the prehistoric Littorina Sea. It is heavily overgrown. Lake bed is covered with dolomite rubble, sludge. The largest tributary - Slocene. Initially, the lake belonged to the Lielupe basin, along the present Vecslocene at Sloka flowing into the Lielupe. In 1905, an approximately 1 km long Starpiņupīte was excavated, which connects the lake with Gulf of Riga. 14 islands with a total area of 15.9 ha, including five artificial islands to promote waterfowl nesting.

== Hydrology ==
The water level of the lake has been changed several times. At the beginning of the 20th century it was 2–2.3 m above sea level, then it was lowered several times, in the beginning of 1940 - it was raised. From 1945 to 1965, the surface of the lake was about 1.3 meters above sea level - at that time the lake was divided into several small llamas. The lake floodplain was swampy. In 1965, a two-lock system was built on the gutter Starpiņupīte. By opening these locks in turn, the movement of passing water inhabitants between the sea and the lake basin was ensured. At the end of 2006, the locks were renovated and automated.

== Tourist attractions ==
Kaņieris, which is exceptionally rich in waterfowl, has status of an Important Bird Area and has been protected since 1964. It is included in Kemeri National Park and also in Kemeri resort sanitary protection zone 1. Western part of the lake - Slocene estuary district - is a nature reserve area.

Boat rental in Andrejsala, bird watching tower is on Nut Island. On the south-western shore Kaņieris castle mound - one of the closest to the sea castle mounds in Latvia, where the second bird-watching tower and nature trail has been built.
