= Firck Palace =

Palace in Latvia

- Talsi, Courland, Latvia
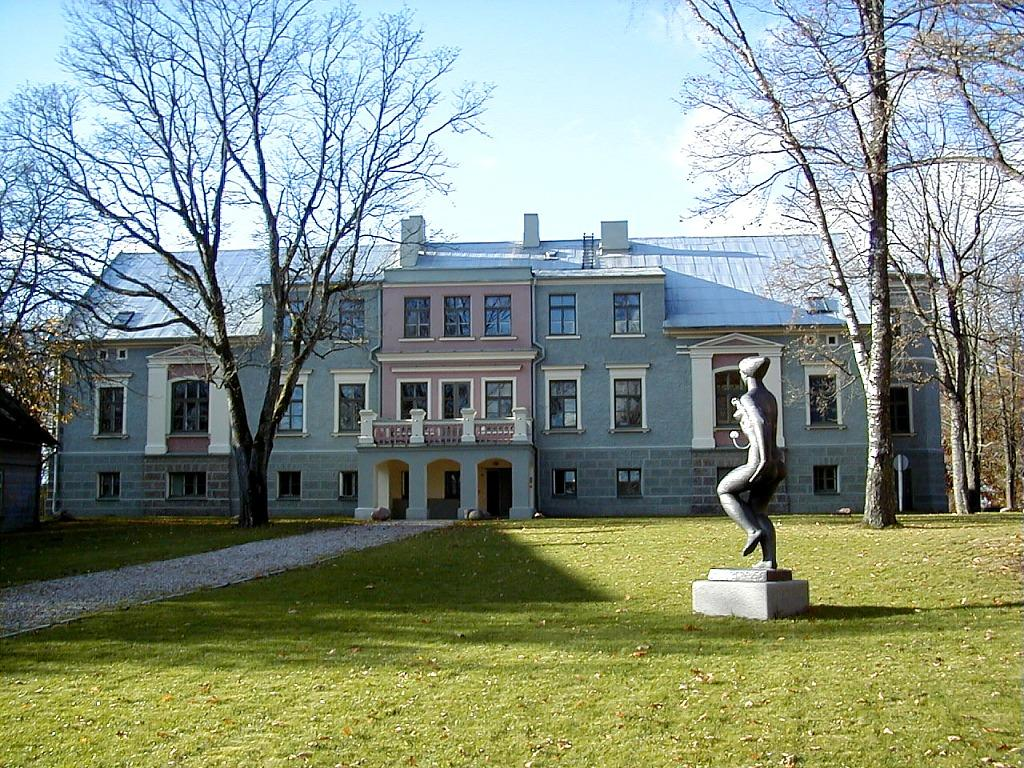

Site information
- Type: Palace
- Open to the public: Yes

Location
- Coordinates: 57°14′33.2″N 22°36′10.8″E

Site history
- Built: 1883

Firck Palace (Latvian: Firksa muižas pils; German: Virckshof) is a palace in Talsi, Talsi Municipality, in the Courland region of Latvia. The building currently houses the Talsi County Museum.

== History ==
It was built for Baron von Fircks in 1883 on the highest of the city's nine hills - Mount Tiguli. More than a hundred years ago, this land was owned by Baron Fircks of Nurmuiža and housed the home and field of Tiguli, the Upseju. In 1883 Baron Heinrich Herman Peter Julius Wilhelm von Fircks (1831-1889) concluded an exchange agreement with his older brother Otto von Fircks (1830-1908). The treaty was entered into the Land Register on August 16, 1884. In 1888 the construction of the new building began. After the death of Heinrich von Fircks, the construction of the building was continued by his son Friedrich Otto von Fircks (1869-1927). The townhouse, called Villa Hochheim, was completed in 1892. The new building was home to Auguste Henriette von Fircks (born Rinck) and Sister Julia Anna von Fircks, the mother of Friedrich Otto von Fircks. The building was built in neoclassical style as a one-storey longitudinal building with a high, crusted plinth and a gable roof. At the same time as the building was being constructed, the baron set up a landscape park using hilly terrain, a pond and city views. Some of the tree nurseries were imported from Germany, part of the then famous Сhristian Wilhelm Schoch's garden in Salaspils. Today it is Talsi Dendrological Park.

The Baron's family lived there until the Latvian Agrarian Reform in 1920s. After agrarian reform von Fircks family repatriated to Germany and the land and buildings were assigned to the Ministry of Education for the construction of a public secondary school. In 1923 the State Talsi Secondary School was opened in this building, K.Mīlenbach Street 19, which later acquired the status of a gymnasium. In the same year the National Talsi High School History Museum was established.

=== Talsi RegionalMuseum ===
Responding to the call of the Latvian Ethnographic Museum to establish regional museums and collect materials on folk history, local science enthusiasts led by teacher Theodore Dzintarkalns, with the active involvement of teachers, students and the community, had already collected 8,500 different subjects by 1928. The Talsi Branch of the Latvian Antiquities Researchers' Association, founded in 1924, also took part in the museum's work.

High school principal Ansis Dreimanis (1882–1968) recounts in his memoir that Theodore Dzintarkalns (1874–1937) "… collected old tools, clothes, jewelry, books and organized a school museum. It became quite famous and many excursionists came to see it." Theodor Dzintarkalns himself regards the establishment of the museum as one of the greatest post-war (after World War I) achievements in Talsi. During the Second World War, the museum's archive and most of the objects were lost - taken to Germany or destroyed on the spot. At the initiative of the Riga History Museum and the Latvian SSR ITK Department of Art, the preserved items were placed in two museums - Talsi County History Museum on Church Square 2 and Talsi County Art Museum on Fabrikas Street 1.

In September 1945, the two museums were united under the name Talsi History and Art Museum and were given space on Rožu Street 7, a nationalized building, the residence and office building of Talsi lawyer Vilis Kaijgar, sent to Siberia. The museum has been renamed many times over the years. For a short time it was the Talsi History Museum, which held separate exhibitions. Afterwards as Talsi County Research Museum, which was opened to visitors in 1948 with the first exposition of history and art. In later years - Talsi Local History Museum, Branch of Tukums Local History and Art Museum (1963–1966), Talsi Local History and Art Museum (1966–1996). In 1996 the museum got its current name. The time when the museum was located at 7 Rožu Street has been significant with the active work of two museum directors in museum development: during the director Janis Znotiņš (1949–1960), although under the banner of obligatory Soviet ideology, professionally research work, exhibition and exposition but during the director Anna Rasa's (1968 - 1994) collection of the museum, complex expeditions in the Talsi area villages and the organization of large-scale art days (1983–1989). Since 1994 the director of the museum is Mirdza Jonele.

On December 21, 1996, the Talsi Regional Museum returned to the historic premises on K.Millenbach 19, with a large gala event, where exhibitions and expositions are located on the three floors of the historic building, as well as the exhibition hall located in the collection building. Every month, two new exhibitions are opened at the museum.

== See also ==
- List of palaces and manor houses in Latvia
