= Engure Municipality =

Municipality of Latvia

Coordinates: 56°57′18″N 23°20′17″E

Engure Municipality Engures novads
- Municipality
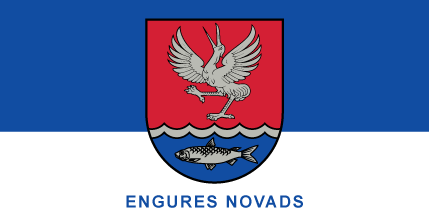
- Flag Coat of arms

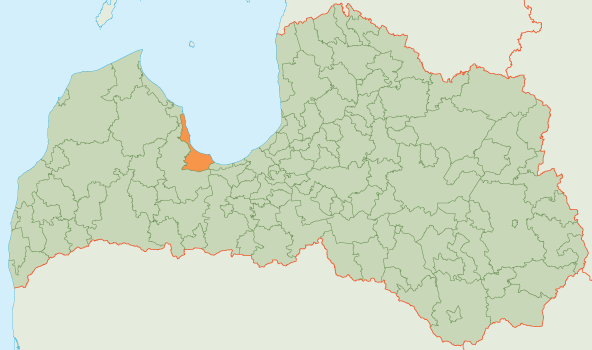
- Country: Latvia
- Formed: 2009
- Centre: Smārde

Government
  - Chairman: Gundars Važa (NA)

Area
  - Total: 396.40 km^{2} (153.05 sq mi)
  - Land: 365.55 km^{2} (141.14 sq mi)
  - Water: 30.85 km^{2} (11.91 sq mi)

Population (2021)
  - Total: 7,147
  - Density: 19.55/km^{2} (50.64/sq mi)
- Website: www.engure.lv

Engure Municipality (Latvian: Engures novads) is a former Latvian municipality situated partly in the region of Courland and partly in Vidzeme. It bordered Mērsrags municipality, Tukums municipality, Jūrmala and the Gulf of Riga. The municipality was formed in 2009 by merging Engure parish, Smārde parish and Lapmežciems parish, with the administrative centre being Smārde. The population in 2020 was 7,124.

On 1 July 2021, Engure Municipality ceased to exist and its territory was merged into Tukums Municipality.

== Population ==
Parish	Population (year)
Engure parish	2518 (2018)
Lapmežciems parish	2324 (2018)
Smārde parish	2557 (2018)

== See also ==
- Administrative divisions of Latvia (2009)
