= Lapmežciems Parish =

Parish of Latvia

- parish of Latvia
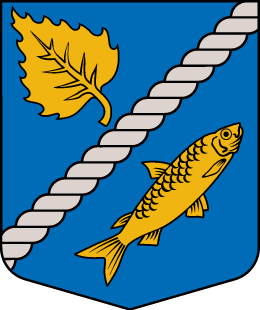
- Coat of arms

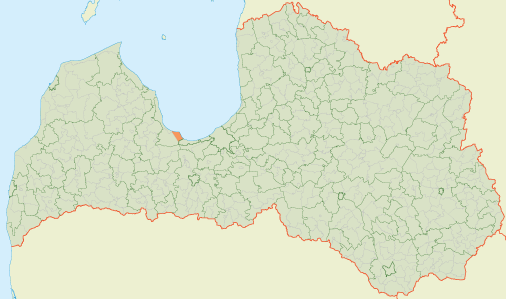
- Coordinates: 57°00′17″N 23°27′54″E
- Country: Latvia

Population (1 January 2026)
  - Total: 2,207

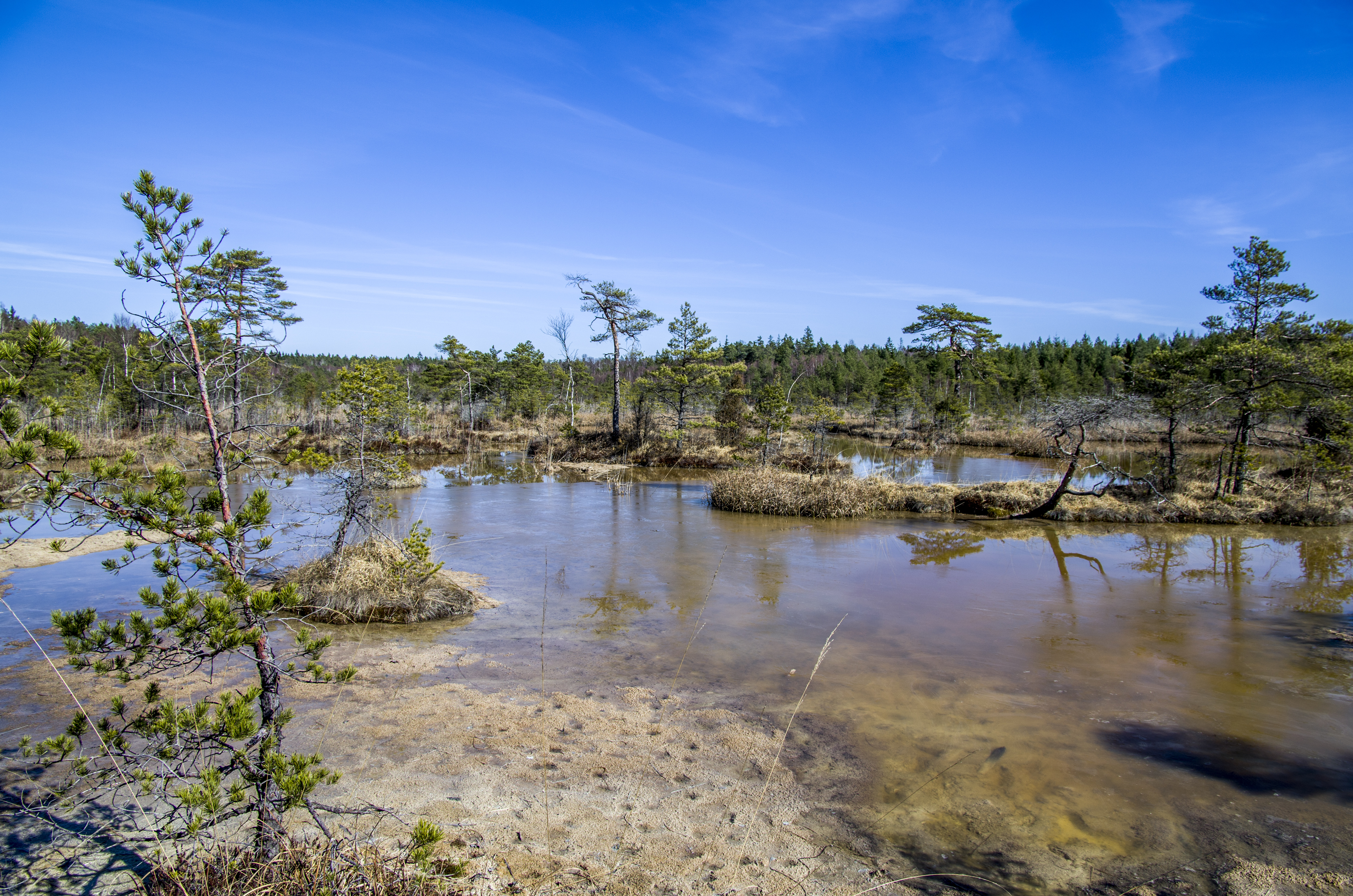
Sulfur lake

Lapmežciems Parish (Latvian: Lapmežciema novads) is an administrative unit of Tukums Municipality, in the Vidzeme region of Latvia. The parish occupies a narrow coastal strip along the Baltic Sea, bordered by the Gulf of Riga to the west and Lake Kaņieris to the east.

“Lapmežs” means “deciduous forest”, thus the parish derives its name from the centenarian oaks, ash trees, and maples that grow abundantly within its territory. Having long served as a home to fishermen and seafarers, The villages of Lapmežciems Parish are also commonly known as Zvejniekciemi (fishermen’s villages), from the Latvian words zvejnieks (fisherman) and ciems (village).

== History ==
The land where the five villages of Lapmežciems Parish now stand was once covered by the Litorina Sea. After the sea receded, ancient fishermen and hunters established settlements near the present day Siliņupe River. In 1954, archaeological excavations uncovered a Neolithic settlement of fishermen and hunters. The excavations provide the earliest evidence of human habitation in the area, dating to the 3rd–2nd millennium BCE, making it the oldest known settlement located so close to the Baltic Sea in Latvia. In 2000, a commemorative stone created by sculptor Oļegs Skarainis was unveiled to mark the site of the settlement.

During the 19th century, the villages of Lapmežciems Parish emerged as a favored summer and bathing destinations for the urban elite. The first reports of seaside bathing along the Riga coast appeared in 1822, but the villages gradually lost prominence as Jūrmala emerged as a more accessible seaside resort.

== Nature ==
The entire parish lies within Ķemeri National Park, offering access to the sea, pine forests, wetlands, lakes, beaches and nature trails. The coastal zone boasts a rich diversity of habitats, ranging from flat, sandy beaches and shores overgrown with herbaceous plants and shrubs to embryonic dunes, sedimentation belts where annual weeds thrive, and sandy cliffs, with forested coastal dunes extending along the entire coastline. Nearly the entire parish is a protected area, with 97% of its territory within the Baltic Sea and Gulf of Riga coastal zone and all of it falling under Ķemeri National Park regulations.

== Villages and settlements of Lapmežciems Parish ==
The territory of Lapmežciems Parish includes five villages:

- Lapmežciems
- Bigauņciems
- Ragaciems
- Antiņciems
- Čaukciems

Today, Lapmežciems serves as the administrative and cultural center of the parish, and it is the largest of the five villages.
