= Kalsnava Arboretum =

Arboretum in Madona Municipality, Latvia

Kalsnavas Dendrārijs
- IUCN category III (natural monument or feature)
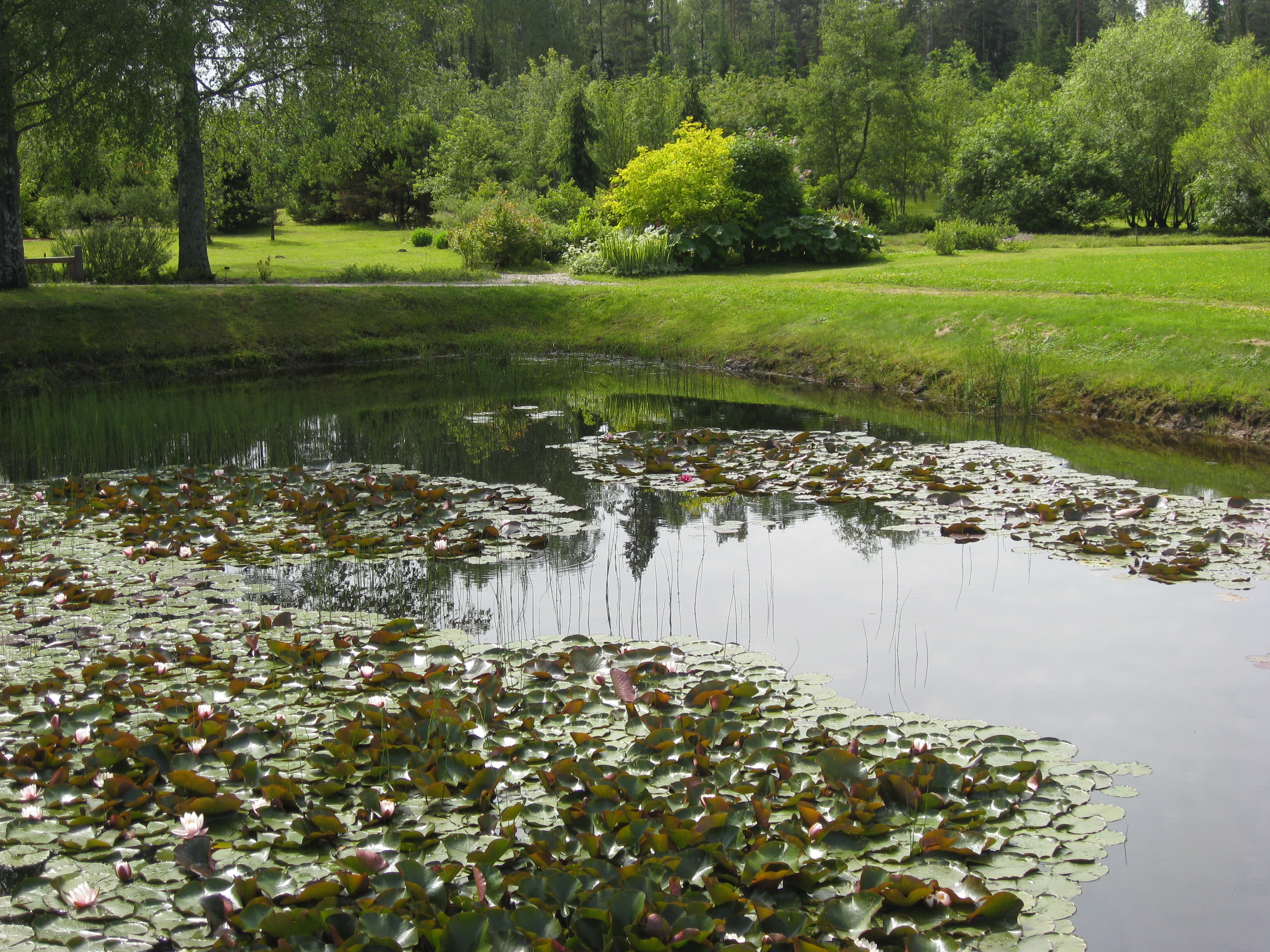
- Water roses in Kalsnava arboretum.

- Location within Latvia
- Location: Latvia
- Nearest city: Jaunkalsnava
- Coordinates: 56°41′12.5″N 25°57′33.4″E
- Area: 1.48 km^{2} (0.57 sq mi)
- Established: 1975
- Governing body: Ministry of Environmental Protection and Regional Development
- Website: www.lvm.lv/seklas-un-stadi/kalsnavas-arboretums

Kalsnava Arboretum (Latvian: Kalsnavas arborētums) is an arboretum in Kalsnava Parish, Madona Municipality, Latvia.

== History ==
The arboretum was founded in 1975 with the purpose "to conduct scientific research in dendrology and forestry and plant foreign woody plants for propagating purposes". It today contains some 2,500 different taxa and some 45,000 individual plants. The whole arboretum is protected as a nature reserve by Latvian law. The arboretum is a member of the Nordic Association of Arboretums and the Baltic Association of Botanical Gardens. The arboretum is open to visitors and offers a variety of services, including the sale of plants.

== Notable species ==
The park is home to several remarkable tree and shrub varieties in Northern Europe and the Baltic States, including a Virginia Tulip (Liriodendron tulipifera), a Fringe Tree (Chionanthus virginicus) and a Kobe Magnolia (Magnolia kobus).

The arboretum also contains the largest collection of peonies of Latvia and also hosts many deciduous trees or evergreen, lilacs, climbing plants or rhododendrons.

Finally, exceptionally in these latitudes, the gardens are blooming for a long time of the year, that is until October with the flowering of Witch-hazel (Hamamelis).

== See also ==
- National Botanic Garden of Latvia
