= Ķemeri National Park =

National park near Jūrmala, Latvia

- Ķemeru Nacionālais Parks
- IUCN category II (national park)
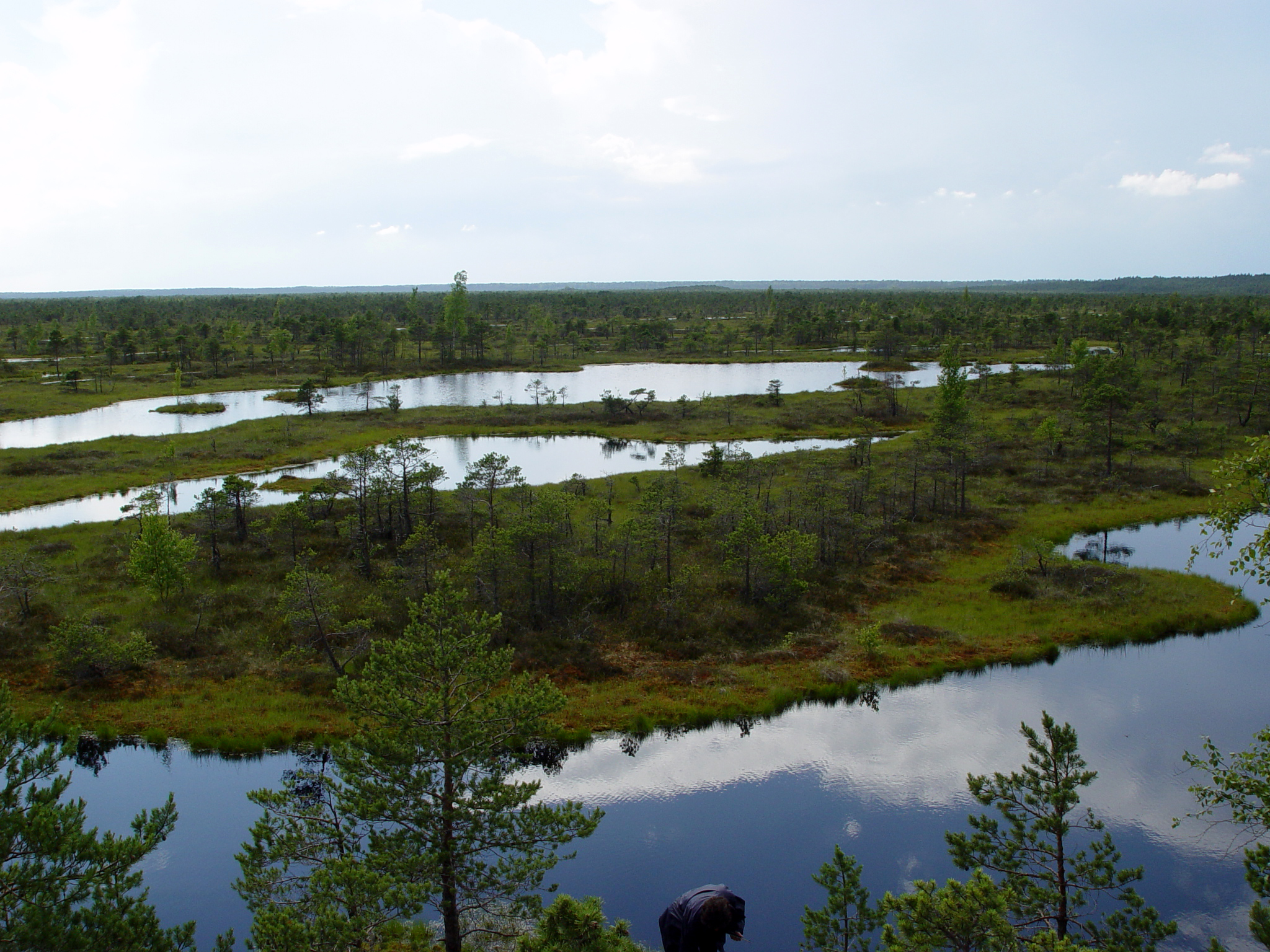
- The Great Ķemeri Bog

- Location within Latvia
- Interactive map of Ķemeri National Park
- Location: Latvia
- Nearest city: Jūrmala
- Coordinates: 56°57′06″N 23°30′45″E
- Area: 361.85 km^{2} (139.71 sq mi)
- Established: 1997
- Administrator: Ministry of Environmental Protection and Regional Development

Ķemeri National Park (Latvian: Ķemeru Nacionālais parks) is a national park located west of the city of Jūrmala, Latvia. Established in 1997, Ķemeri is the third largest national park in the country by area, covering an area of 381.65 km^{2}. The territory of the park is mostly occupied by forests and mires, the most significant of them being The Great Ķemeri Bog (Latvian: Lielais Ķemeru tīrelis). There are also several lakes, that are former lagoons of the Littorina Sea. Lake Kaņieris is a Ramsar site. The park also protects the famous natural mineral-springs and muds, used for centuries because of their therapeutic nature. The springs led to development of many resorts, spas, and sanitariums in the 19th century.

== Ecosystem ==
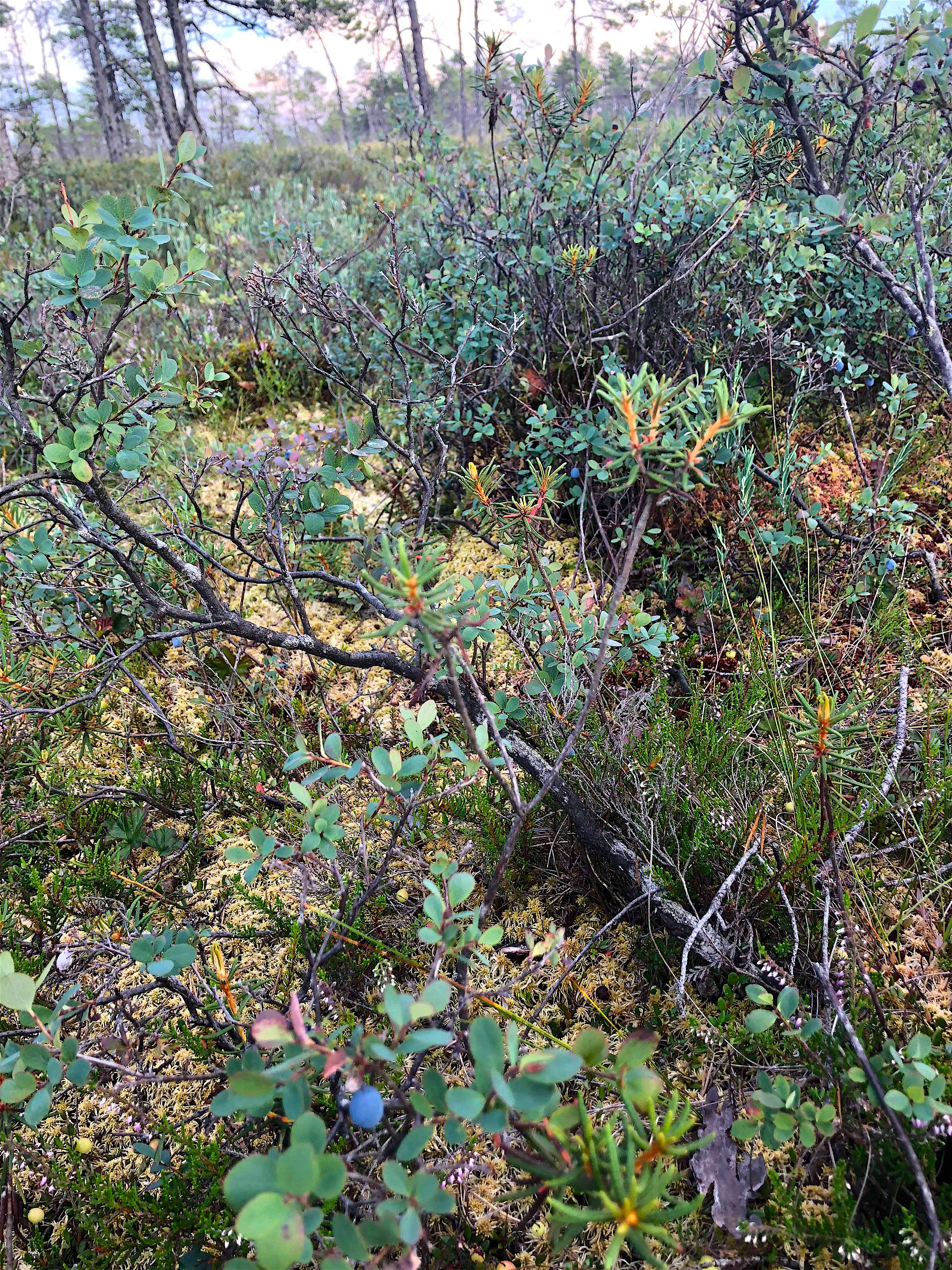
Bog bilberries in Ķemeri National Park

Forests occupy 57% of the total area of the park. Fragmented mosaic distribution of the forests is not typical for the territory, forests are relatively evenly distributed in the whole area of the national park with some inclusion of meadows and areas not covered in forest. Bogs occupy 24% of the total area of Ķemeri National Park. All three wetland types are found here – fens, transition and raised bogs. Lielais Ķemeru tīrelis bog is an internationally important wetland. Many species of plants thrive in the bog, especially mosses and orchids. Meadows – both dry and wet – occupy 6% of the territory. Water in the form of lakes, rivers, sulfur springs and sea occupy 10% of the park's territory. Many of the out flowing streams have been altered over history to drain the marshland for agriculture, however the waters still support a wide variety of rare species, such as native snails and mussels, fishers, storks and otters.

=== Birds ===
The bog is home for a number of Latvian bird species, such as the Common crane, Wood Sandpiper and European Golden Plover. The latter two species only breeding habitat is the raised bog.

=== Moss Bog Berries ===
The bog also contains edible wild berries such as cranberries, crowberries, cloudberries and blueberries.

=== Bog Plants ===
Raised bog is not rich in diversity of plants due to the harsh conditions created by the bog such as low nutrient content and low oxygen content. Thus, the flora is specifically adapted to these conditions such as Eriophorum vaginatum, Calluna vulgaris, Ledum palustre, Rhynchospora alba, Andromeda polifolia, Drosera, Pinus sylvestris and Sphagnum.

=== Sulfur Springs ===
Ķemeri National Park has many natural sulfur springs, due to its sublayer of gypsum and soil bacteria (Desulfovibrio desulfuricans), forming H_{2}S gas which easily dissolves in the water. The therapeutic mineral waters and muds found in Ķemeri are used in health resorts located in Ķemeri town nearby, used to treat mostly digestive system and skin problems.

== Tourism ==
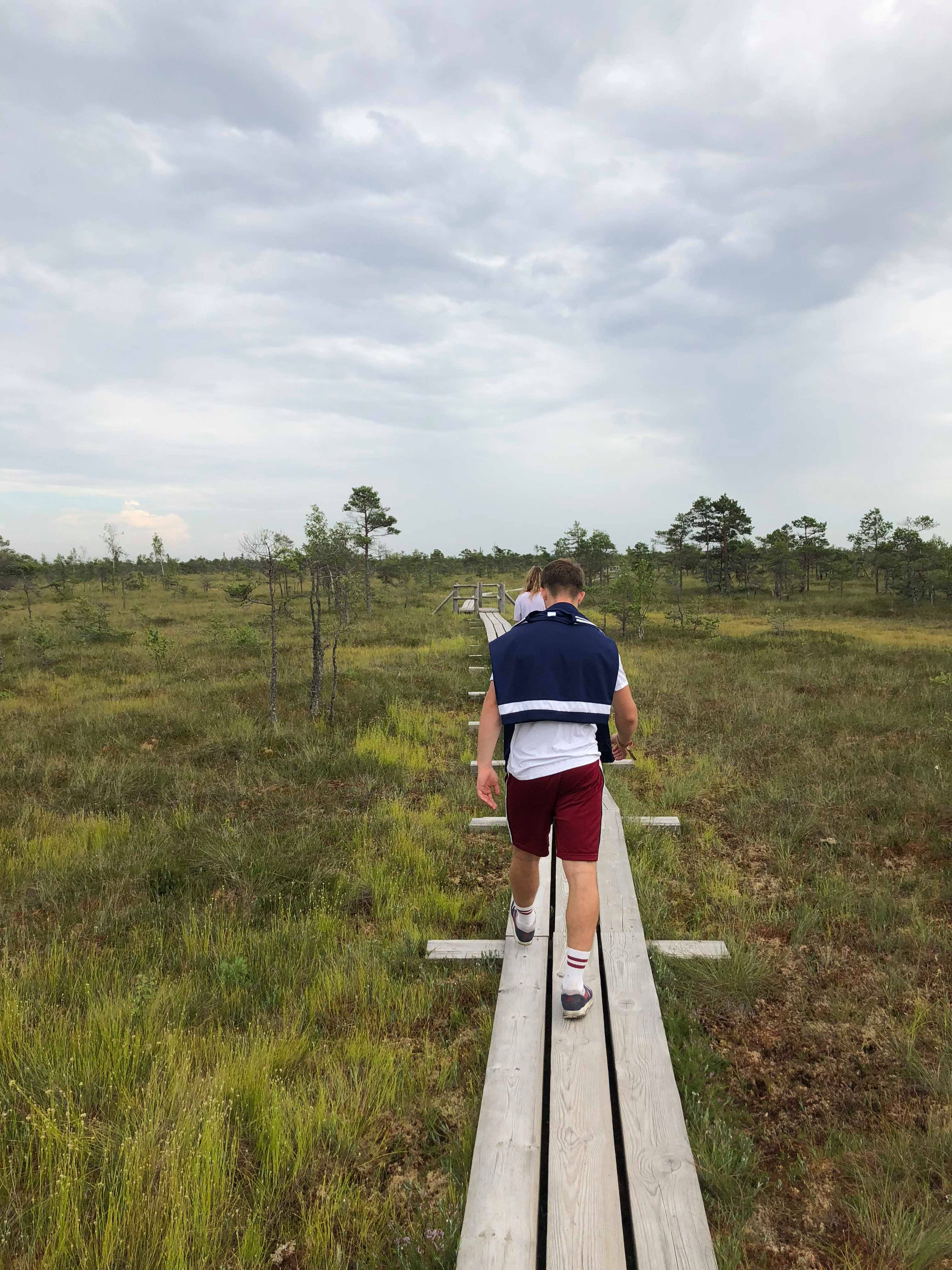
Boardwalk in the Great Ķemeri Bog

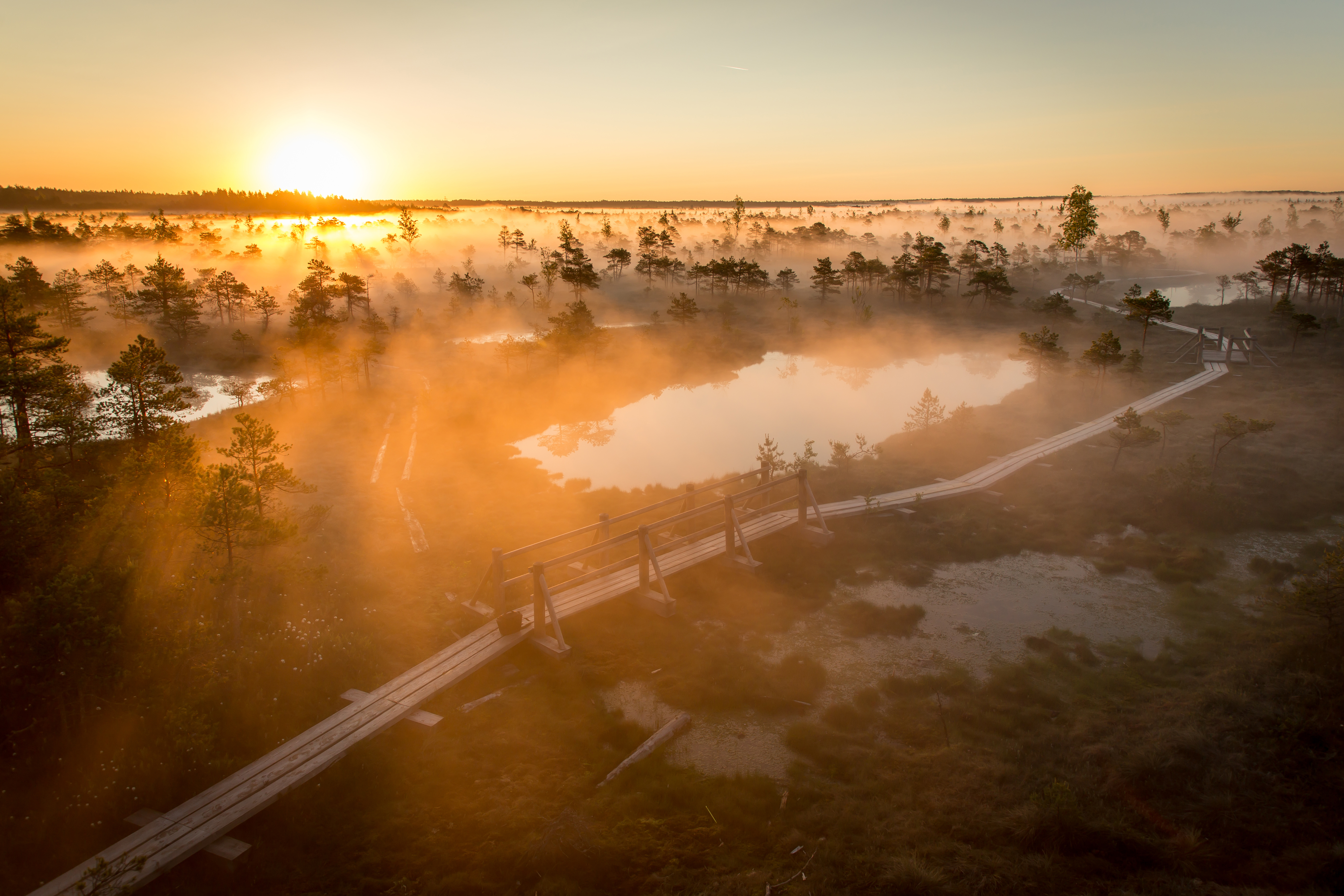
Ķemeri bog at sunset

There are several nature trails and broadwalks in the Ķemeri National Park. The most popular of them located in The Great Ķemeri Bog has a short (1.4 kilometres (0.87 mi)) and a long (3.4 kilometres (2.1 mi)) boardwalk with an observation platform, popular with photographers for sunrise and sunset scenes, located on the longer one.

== History ==
Formation of bogs in Latvia started in the postglacial period, approximately 10,000 years ago as the climate became warmer and more humid. Thus allowing Sapropelic mud formation at the bottom of the lake, consisting of sandy soil and the remains of water plants and animals.

=== Recent History ===
Numerous tanks from World War II were swallowed into the bog, due to depths reaching up to two stories.

== See also ==
- List of national parks in the Baltics
