= University of Latvia Botanical Garden =

Botanical garden in Riga, Latvia

- Latvian: Latvijas Universitātes Botāniskais dārzs
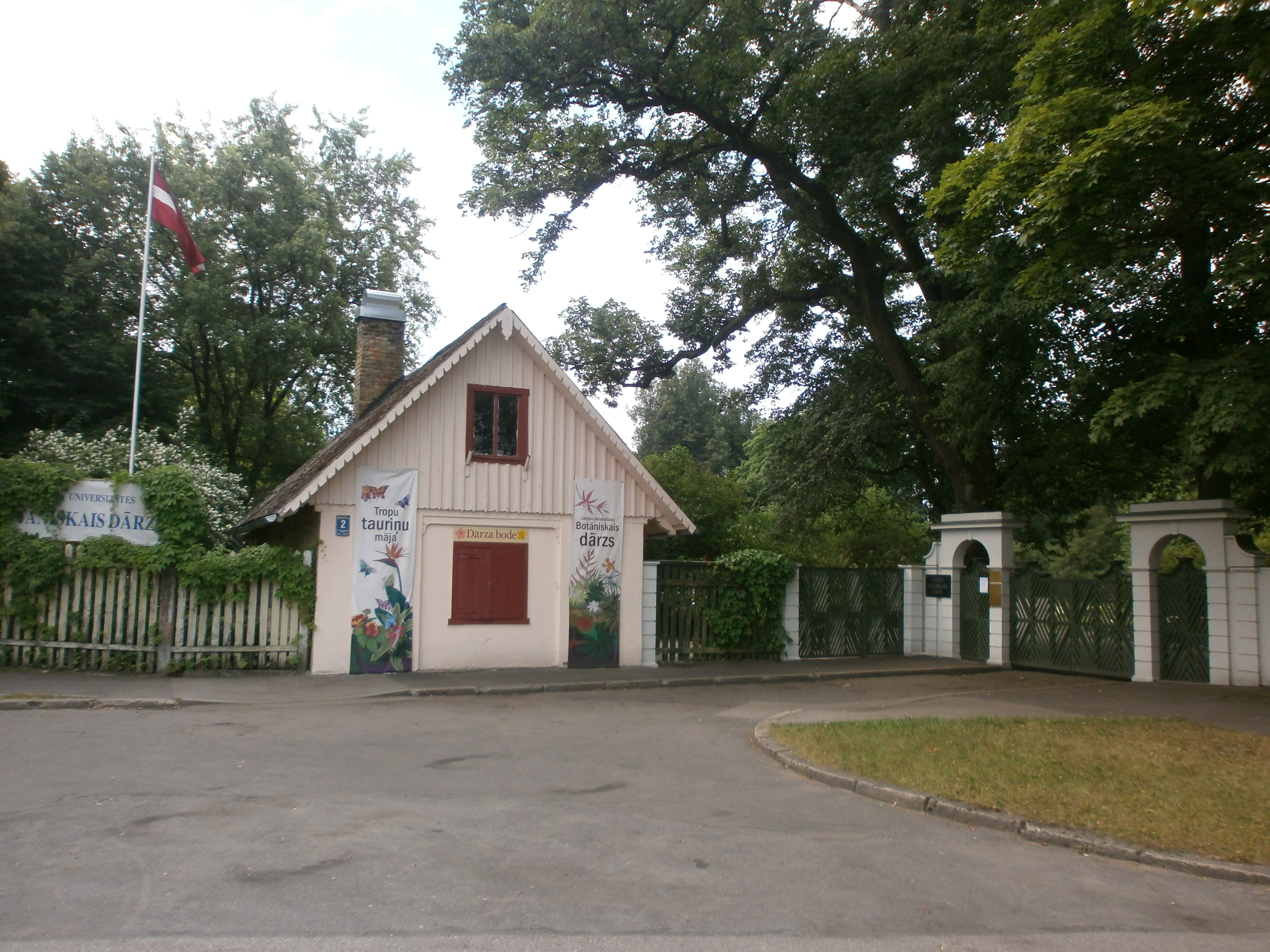
- Interactive map of University of Latvia Botanical Garden
- Type: Botanical garden
- Location: Riga, Latvia
- Coordinates: 56°57′0.61″N 24°3′35.59″E
- Area: circa 14.8 hectares (37 acres)
- Created: 1922
- Open: Yes
- Website: www.botanika.lu.lv/en/

University of Latvia Botanical Garden (Latvian: Latvijas Universitātes Botāniskais dārzs) is botanical garden in Riga, Latvia. It is the oldest botanical garden in Latvia.

== History ==
Founded in 1922, was originally located in Dreiliņi and was supervised by the Institute of Plant Morphology and Systematics of the University of Latvia. Has been in place of the former Wolfschmidtshof Manor since 1926.

== Structure ==
The Botanical Garden of the University of Latvia has several departments, which are further divided into sectors, laboratories. It deals with the development of the knowledge base of ornamental horticulture and landscaping, plant introduction and experimental research. In the territory of the Botanical Garden there is an Earth observation station of the Institute of Astronomy of the University of Latvia and the geodetic starting point of the Latvian trigonometric network.

The collection of plants in the botanical garden consists of about 8,300 taxa, of which about 2,000 are tropical and subtropical plants. About 750 taxa can be found in the arboretum, as well as a collection of ornamental plants and medicinal plants, palm orangery.

Tropical Butterfly House has been located in the Botanical Garden of the University of Latvia since 2012, home to butterflies from the tropical jungles of South America, Asia, and Africa.

== Education ==
The Botanical Garden of the University of Latvia offers excursions "accompanied by a guide, which gives an opportunity to find out the origin of the plants in the plant collection, the most important characteristics and the most interesting facts. The Botanical Garden of the University of Latvia offers students to attend on various botanical topics.

The Botanical Garden of the University of Latvia hosts various cultural events - concerts, lectures, dance performances, open-air cinema screenings, annual celebrations, solstice fairs and other events that allow you not only to enjoy the splendor of nature, but also to learn something new and relax.

== Development ==
In 2013, patrons Boris and Ināra Teterev Foundation and the Rector of the University of Latvia Mārcis Auziņš signed a memorandum of understanding on cooperation and support for projects for the development of the University of Latvia Botanical Garden, cultural heritage, skills. The project was implemented until the end of 2017. Within four years, the central part of the garden was restored, as well as part of the rhododendron, perennial and fern plantations. The old wooden board fence was replaced with a modern and durable metal fence, and a Latvian wild plant collection and rock garden were also established. In 2017, the apple orchard was renovated.

== Gallery ==
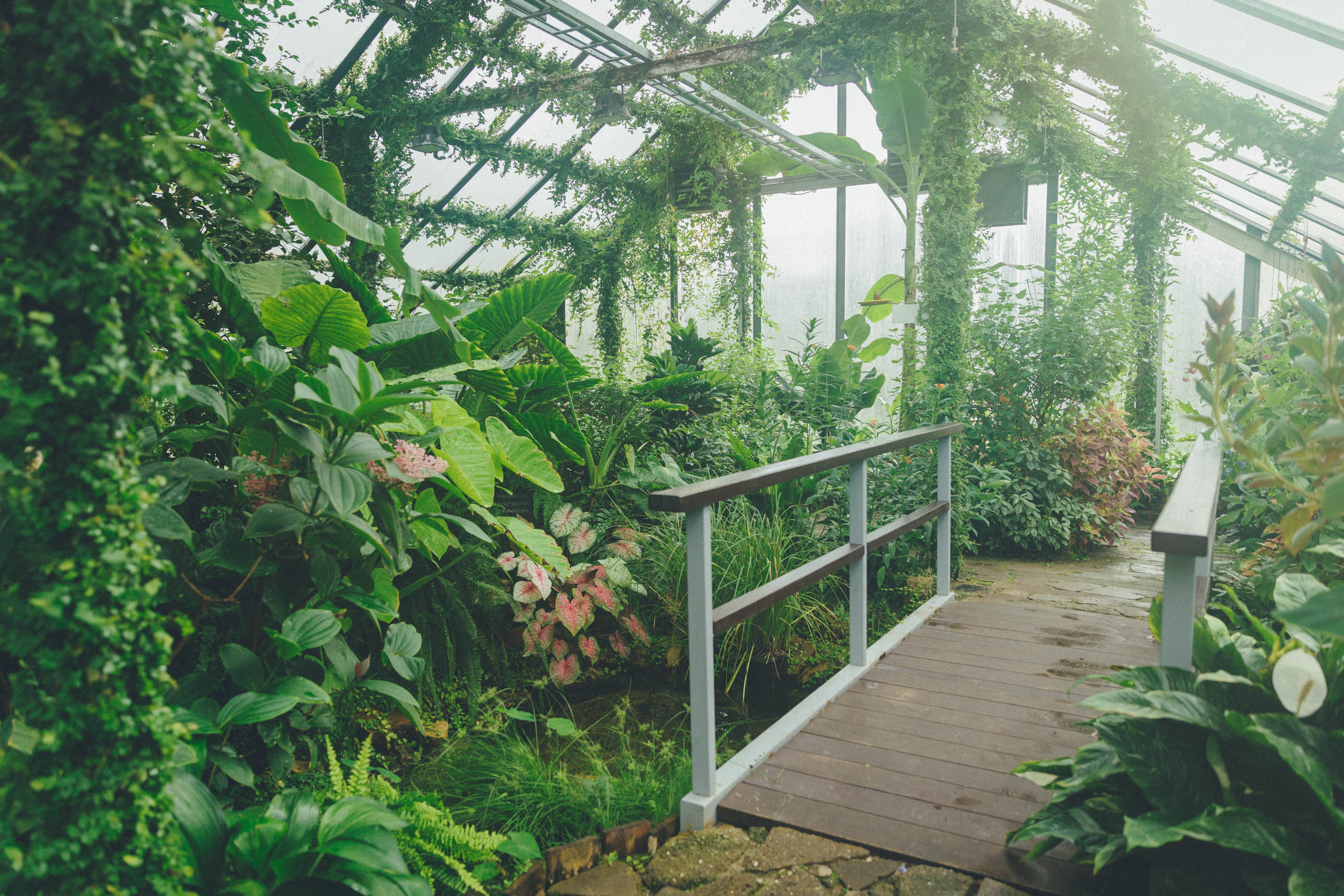

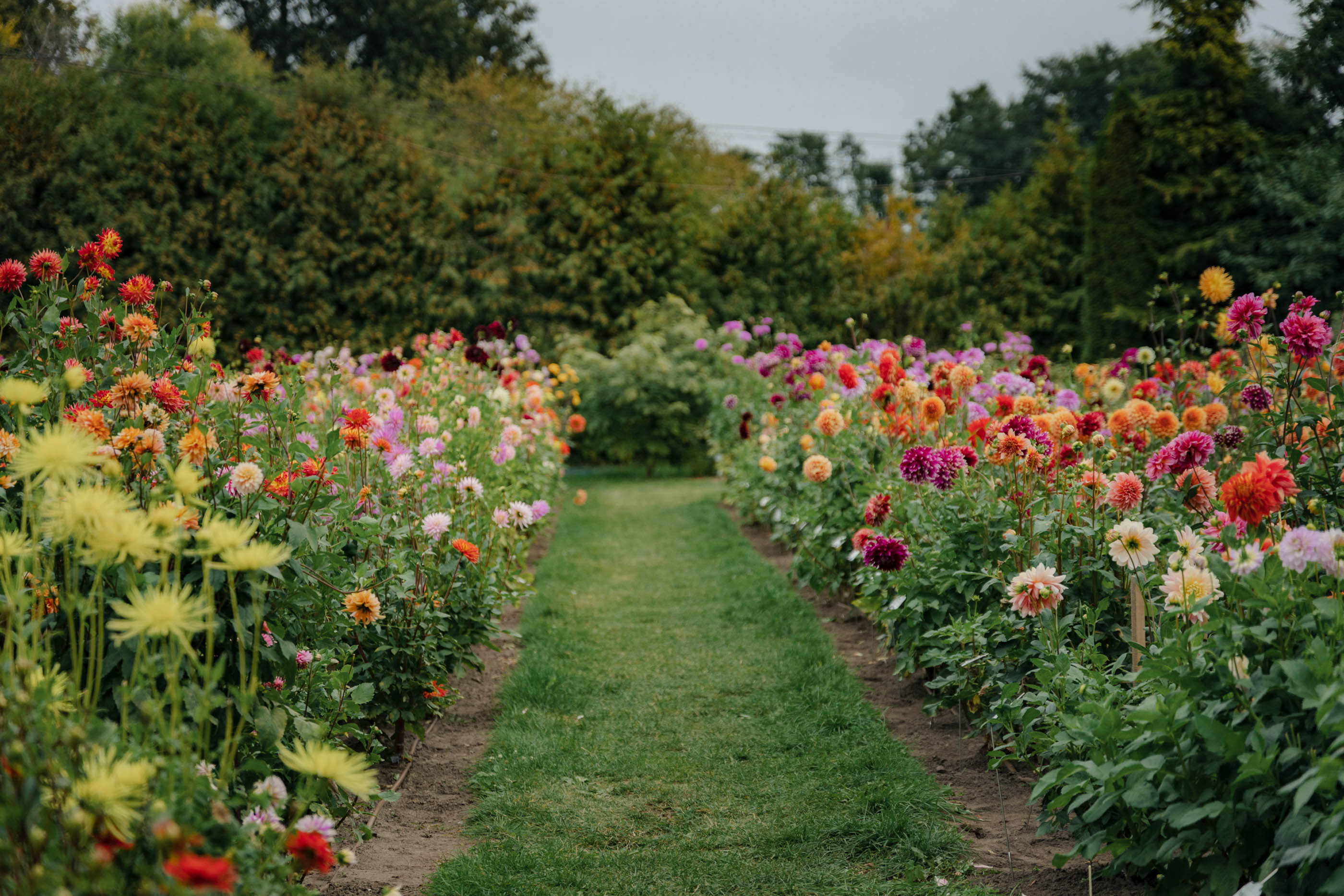
