= Klapkalnciems =

Village in Latvia

Coordinates: 57.0397°N 23.3631°E

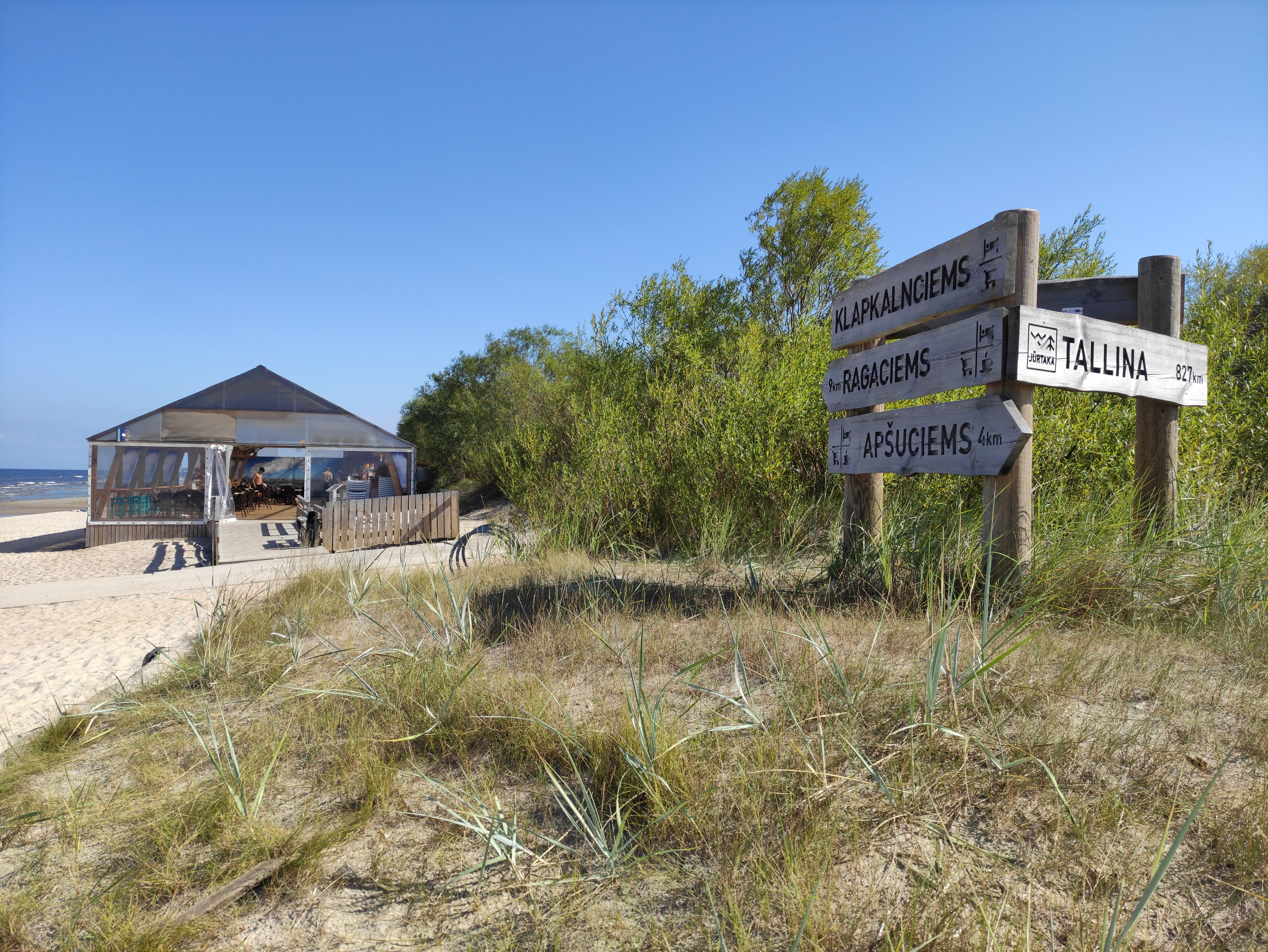

Klapkalnciems (German: Kneis) is a part of the Engure Parish, Tukums Municipality, in the Courland region of Latvia on the seashore of the Baltic Sea on the Bay of Riga.

== History ==
Klapkalnciems was part of the Russo-German front line in the Eastern front of World War I during 1916. Klapkalnciems belonged long times to the German 8th army (German: Armeeoberkommando 8). In 1916, it was occupied by the 1st Reserve Battalion. On 14 September 1916, the 27th jaeger battalion replaced it. The 27th jaeger battalion was a part of 29th mixed combined brigade (German: 29. Gemischte Ersatz-Brigade) of 8th Ersatz Division.

The 4th Jaeger company was placed on the coast from Klapkalnciems to the river. It was replaced by the 2nd Jaeger company on 4 October and 1st company on 11 November. As the 27th Battalion was withdrawn to Liepaja to the Baeyr and Hansa garrisons, the positions were taken by the 263rd Jaegerregiment. On the Russian side of the front, there were the Siberian 55th rifle regiment (Russian: 55-й Сибирский стрелковый полк), which was formed on the basis of the Siberian 43rd rifle regiment in Omsk in August 1914.

The Russians bombed the positions with Ilya Muromets bombers and shelled with 210 mm howitzers.

The Finnish voluntary troops stayed on the region from the late August to the December 1916. A memorial stone is set up near the coast marked with the text Somu jegeru kauju vieta 1916.gada.

== See also ==
- 27th Jäger Battalion (Finland)
- 29. gemischte Ersatz-Brigade (German Empire)

== Photographs ==
- The panorama on the seashore viewat.org
- The seashore Panoramio is no longer available
- German Villa Gugel, 1916 Latvija20gadsimts.lv / Apkopojums / Pilsētas un vietas / Klapkalnciems
