= National Botanic Garden of Latvia =

Botanical garden in Salaspils, Latvia

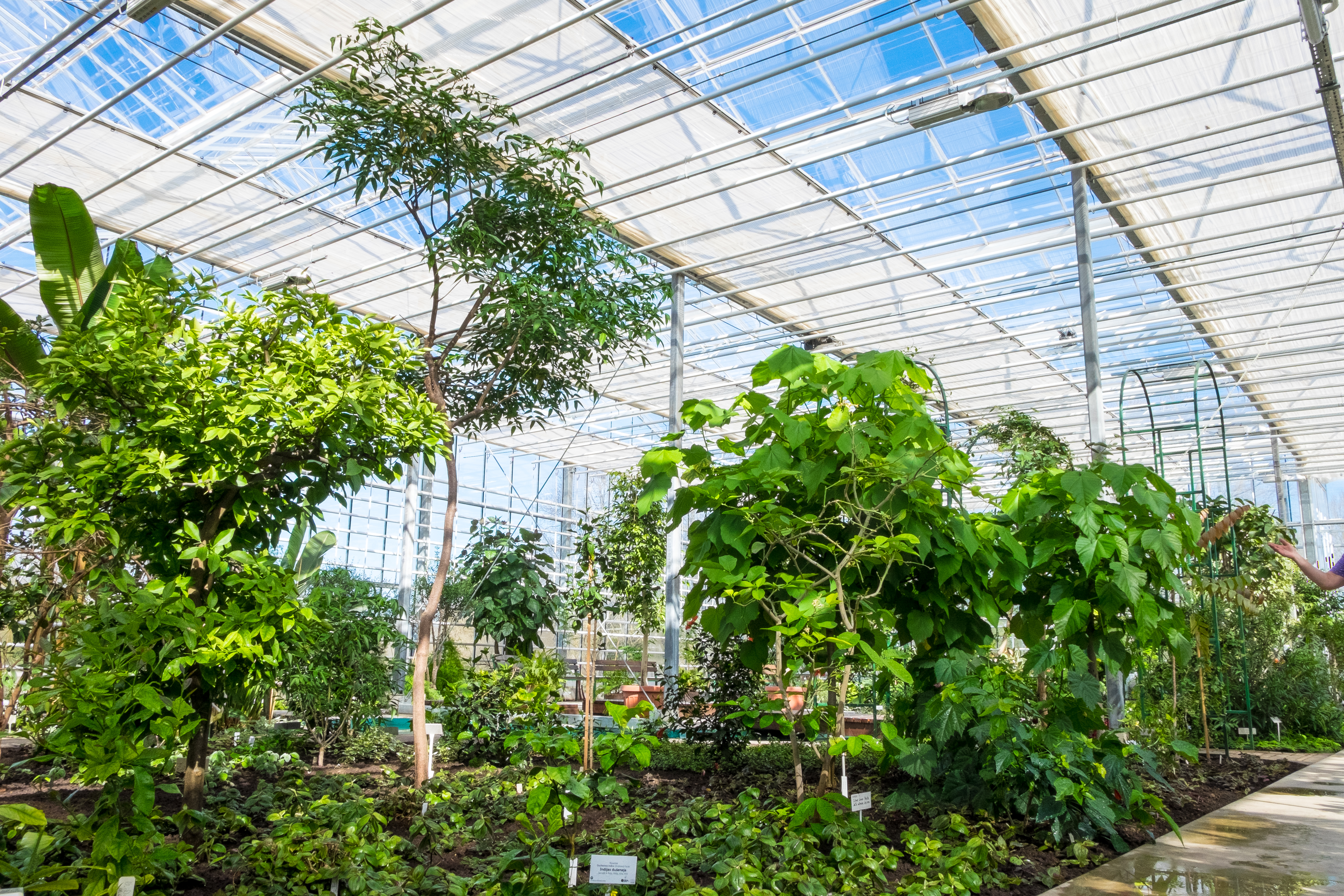
- The conservatory in 2015
- Interactive map of National Botanic Garden of Latvia
- Type: Botanical garden
- Location: Salaspils, Latvia
- Coordinates: 56°51′49.6″N 24°21′30″E
- Area: 129 hectares (320 acres)
- Created: 1 September 1956
- Operator: Nature Conservation Agency
- Website: nbd.gov.lv

The National Botanic Garden of Latvia (Latvian: Nacionālais botāniskais dārzs) is a botanical garden in Salaspils, Latvia. It covers 129 hectares (320 acres). The garden lists more than 14,000 plant taxa in its living collections, including species, forms and cultivated varieties.

Established in 1956 as the botanical garden of the Latvian Academy of Sciences, it developed from an earlier commercial nursery and received national botanical garden status in 1992. On 1 January 2026, its administration was transferred to Latvia's Nature Conservation Agency.

== History ==
=== Nursery origins ===
A commercial nursery preceded the botanical garden. Christian Wilhelm Schoch established the business in 1836, with a seed shop in Riga and a nursery at Ganību Dambis; the nursery subsequently moved to Salaspils. Pēteris Balodis bought it in 1919. Its state-run successor, established in autumn 1944, specialised in fruit trees and berry bushes. Renamed the Gardening Experimental Station in 1947, it also cultivated ornamental plants.

=== Botanical garden and administration ===
On 1 September 1956, the Latvian Academy of Sciences established its botanical garden at Salaspils, drawing on the nursery's collection of more than 2,000 taxa. Its work included plant introduction, breeding and botanical and horticultural research. The garden received scientific research institute status in 1968 and national botanical garden status in 1992.

A reorganisation effective on 1 January 2013 replaced the state agency with a state scientific institute constituted as a separate public-law body. That institute was dissolved at the end of 2024, and a new direct-administration institution, the Latvian National Botanic Garden, assumed its functions on 1 January 2025. A further merger transferred the garden's functions, staff, property and obligations to the Nature Conservation Agency from 1 January 2026.

In August 2026, the Ministry of Smart Administration and Regional Development proposed restoring the garden as a separate government agency from 1 October 2026, subject to Cabinet approval.

== Grounds ==
The site combines older parkland with later collection plantings, a terraced rock garden and greenhouse displays. The Old Park was planted in 1932 and retains trees from the 1920s and 1930s, including the 'Schwedleri' cultivar of Norway maple and several forms of lime tree. Magnolias and conifers grow among the established plantings, with a separate display of Hosta cultivars.

The rock garden's terraces contain more than 400 plant taxa, among them bulbs, small shrubs and herbaceous perennials. They were laid out between 1961 and 1965 to a design by I. Davidsone and A. Pone.

== Collections ==
=== Trees and shrubs ===
Woody plants account for more than 5,000 taxa in the garden's published collection overview. The arboretum has two contrasting layouts. In the older part, related trees and shrubs are grouped according to Adolf Engler's classification system. The newer part, first planted in 1986, groups plants geographically.

The collections were built through both seed exchange with other botanical gardens and material collected in the wild. Between 1960 and 1990, the garden's dendrologists undertook expeditions to regions including the Altai Mountains, Caucasus and Tian Shan, collecting plants from mountain, steppe, taiga and tundra habitats.

=== Ornamental and useful plants ===
In July 2021, the rose garden held nearly 400 cultivars and more than 5,000 plants, according to Latvian public media. These included 23 Latvian-bred park roses. Seasonal flower displays include tulips, daffodils, dahlias and summer annuals, while irises are planted near the Old Park.

A separate collection covers food, aromatic and medicinal plants. The garden lists approximately 700 species and cultivars in this collection, including currants, gooseberries, Actinidia, edible-fruited honeysuckles and sea buckthorn. Its displays relate cultivated plants to habitats such as woodland, meadows and wetlands.

=== Conservatory ===
The greenhouse collection began in 1956 and grew through international seed exchanges and propagation from seeds and cuttings. By January 2015, several thousand plants had been moved out of the old greenhouses, where inadequate winter heating and lack of space had limited cultivation and display. The replacement conservatory formed part of a €3.4 million project, supported by the European Regional Development Fund, which also included staff facilities and road resurfacing.

The new conservatory opened to visitors on 25 April 2015. It has four public halls with different growing conditions, accommodating succulents, tropical plants and plants from warmer and cooler subtropical climates. Its collections contain more than 2,000 taxa, including cacti, aloes, agaves and tropical and subtropical fruit plants. Additional cultivation areas house ornamental plant collections and propagation facilities. A plant propagation and sanitation unit also serves as a rescue centre for specimens confiscated under CITES controls on international trade.

== Research and conservation ==
The garden conserves rare Latvian plants outside their natural habitats through outdoor cultivation and plant tissue culture. It began its rare-plant conservation programme in 1981 and established an in vitro collection in 2003. Its public display of protected native plants uses five raised beds representing different habitats, including woodland, wet meadows, eskers and the seashore. Plants in these beds were propagated in laboratory culture before being transferred outdoors.

A study published by the garden's researchers in 2010 tested the cultivation of 23 rare or endangered species in four outdoor habitats during 2008 and 2009. Twenty species adapted successfully to the experimental conditions. These were initial results from cultivation within the botanical garden, not from reintroductions into the wild.

One species maintained in tissue culture is the Alpine butterwort, Pinguicula alpina, which disappeared from the wild in Latvia. The garden obtained seeds from Vidumäe Nature Reserve in Estonia for possible reintroduction trials. In January 2020, Latvian Radio reported that plants had flowered in the laboratory, while earlier attempts to reintroduce the species into the Latvian countryside had been unsuccessful.

By September 2026, the garden continued to maintain rare-plant collections and provide nature education, but Latvian Television reported that research was no longer a separate part of its work.

== Education ==
The Botania environmental education centre opened to the public on 1 February 2024. It presents plant life through more than 100 topics using physical displays, interactive exhibits and digital games. Construction and equipping took five years and cost just under €3 million, with support from the European Union's Cohesion Fund.

During its first year, the centre developed a school programme to support nature studies and biology teaching, together with activity kits for families. Its multifunctional greenhouse also became a venue for seminars and conferences for education, cultural and nature-sector specialists.

== See also ==
- Kalsnava Arboretum
