= Engure Parish =

Parish of Latvia

- parish of Latvia
- Coat of arms

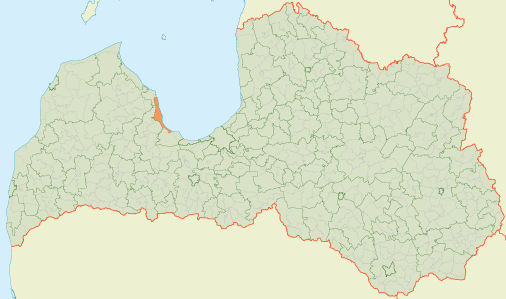
- 57°10′07″N 23°11′28″E
- Country: Latvia

Area
  - Total: 132.76 km^{2} (51.26 sq mi)
  - Land: 115.94 km^{2} (44.76 sq mi)
  - Water: 16.82 km^{2} (6.49 sq mi)

Population (1 January 2024)
  - Total: 2,634
  - Density: 20/km^{2} (51/sq mi)

Engure Parish (Latvian: Engures pagasts) is an administrative unit of Tukums Municipality, in the Courland region of Latvia.
