= Aero L-39 Albatros =

Trainer aircraft family by Aero

L-39 Albatros
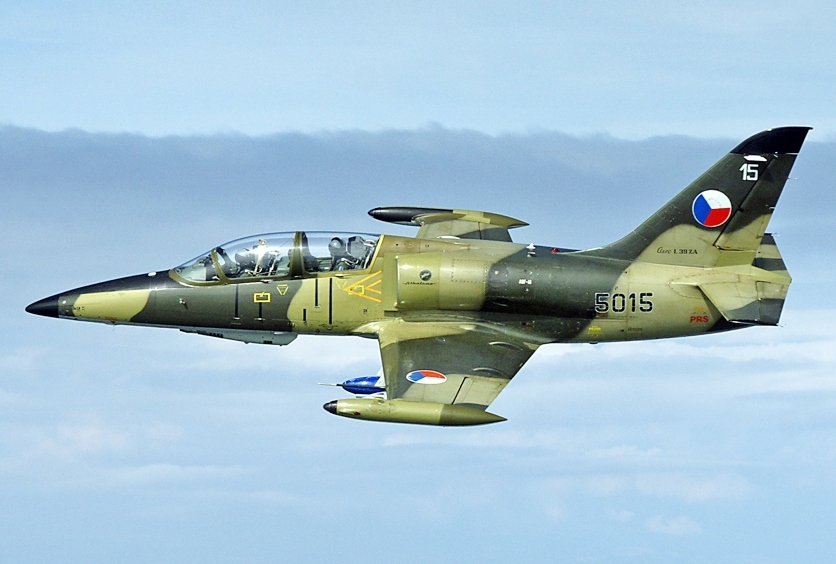
- A Czech Air Force L-39

General information
- Type: Military trainer aircraft Light ground-attack aircraft
- National origin: Czechoslovakia
- Manufacturer: Aero Vodochody
- Designer: Jan Vlček
- Status: In service
- Primary users: Soviet Air Force (historical) Ukrainian Air Force; Czechoslovak Air Force; Libyan Air Force
- Number built: 2,900

History
- Manufactured: 1971–1996; 2015–present (L-39 Skyfox)
- Introduction date: 28 March 1972 with the Czechoslovak Air Force
- First flight: 4 November 1968
- Developed from: Aero L-29 Delfín
- Developed into: Aero L-59 Super Albatros; Aero L-159 ALCA; Aero L-39 Skyfox

The Aero L-39 Albatros is a high-performance jet trainer designed and produced by Aero Vodochody in the Czech Republic. In addition to performing basic and advanced pilot training, it has also flown combat missions in a light-attack role. Despite its manufacturing origin in the Warsaw Pact, the L-39 never received a NATO reporting name.

The L-39 Albatros was designed during the 1960s as a successor to the Aero L-29 Delfín, an early jet-powered principal training aircraft. Performing its maiden flight on 4 November 1968, it became the first trainer aircraft in the world to be equipped with a turbofan powerplant. Quantity production of the L-39 Albatros proceeded in 1971; one year later, it was formally recognized by the majority of the Warsaw Pact countries as their preferred primary trainer. Accordingly, thousands of L-39s would be produced for various military customers in Eastern Europe. Additionally, it was exported to a range of countries across the world both as a trainer and a light-attack aircraft. Since the 1990s, it has also become popular among civilian operators. By the end of the century, in excess of 2,800 L-39s had served with over 30 air forces.

Several derivatives of the L-39 Albatros were developed. During the 1980s, Aero Vodochody used it as the basis for the L-59 Super Albatros, an enlarged and updated model. Furthermore, the L-39 lineage would be extended to the L-139, a prototype L-39 fitted with a Western-sourced Garrett TFE731 engine. A combat-oriented development of the aircraft, designated as the L-159 ALCA, entered production in 1997, and has since been procured by a range of export customers. Production of the original L-39 came to an end during the mid-1990s, orders having declined substantially following the end of the Cold War. At the Farnborough Airshow in July 2014, Aero Vodochody announced the launch of the L-39NG, an upgraded and modernised version of the L-39; this programme is set to produce new-build aircraft alongside the extensive rebuilding of existing aircraft. In 2023, production of the L-39NG resumed under the name Skyfox, with 34 aircraft on order.

== Development ==
In 1964, the Czechoslovak aircraft manufacturer Aero Vodochody embarked on a new design project to meet the specified requirements for a "C-39" (C for cvičný – trainer), setting up a design team under the leadership of Jan Vlček. This aircraft was to serve as a replacement for the Aero L-29 Delfín, an early jet-powered trainer, as a principal training aircraft. Vlcek envisioned the type, a twin-seat single-engine aircraft, being adopted as the primary trainer throughout the Warsaw Pact nations.

On 4 November 1969, the L-39 (under the designation "Prototype X-02" – the second airframe to be built) conducted its maiden flight, for which it was piloted by Rudolf Duchoň, the factory's test pilot. Serial production of the initial model of the L-39, designated L-39C, commenced in 1971. During 1972, the L-39 Albatros was formally recognized by the majority of the countries comprising the Warsaw Pact as their preferred primary trainer, after which point, sizable orders from military customers throughout the bloc proceeded, many of which were from the Soviet Air Forces. In 1974, the first L-39 trainer entered service with the Czechoslovak Air Force.

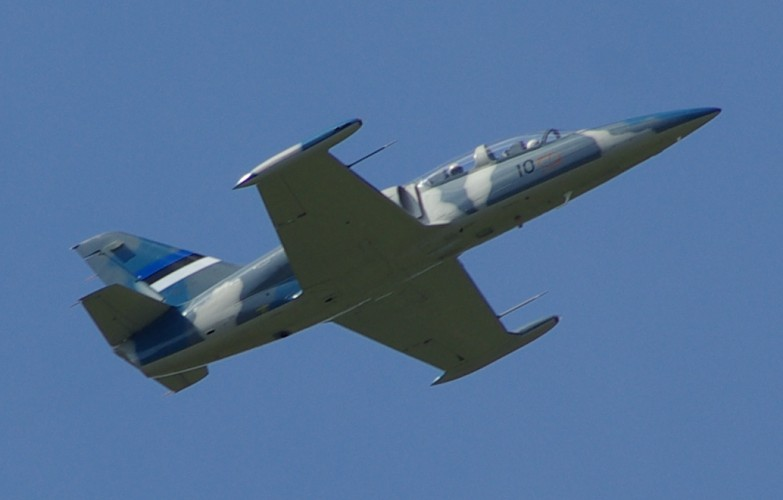
An Estonian L-39 in flight, 2007

Several specialised variants of the base L-39 design were quickly introduced. In 1972, a purpose-built target tug variant, the L-39V, conducted its initial flight. During 1975, the first L-39ZO training/light combat model, which was equipped with four underwing hardpoints as well as a strengthened wing and modified landing gear, performed its first flight. In 1977, the first L-39ZA light combat variant, which was fitted with a single Gryazev-Shipunov GSh-23 cannon mounted underneath the fuselage in addition to the four hardpoints and strengthening of the L-39ZO, made its maiden flight.

According to aerospace publication Flight International, roughly 200 L-39s were being sold each year in the jet trainer market during the late 1980s. According to the Stockholm International Peace Research Institute, in 1993, the total export orders gained for the L-39 represented 80 per cent of the value of all Czech military product export sales made for that year. During the 1990s, shortly following the dissolution of the Soviet Union and the end of the Cold War, Aero Vodochody decided to develop versions of the Albatros equipped with Western-sourced avionics, engines, and weapon systems. Around the same time, Aero Vodochody formed an active partnership with Elbit Systems of Israel, under which a number of L-39s were delivered to Elbit to be equipped with modern electronics and onboard systems before being re-exported to end users such as the Royal Thai Air Force.

Sales of the L-39 declined during the 1990s. This downturn has been attributed to the loss of the captive Warsaw Pact trainer market, to which a substantial proportion of the total aircraft manufactured had been historically sold; other potential factors cited include allegations about Czechoslovak banks being unable to finance the defense industry and inaction on the part of the Czechoslovak government; and concerns over the quality of manufacturing standards. In 1996, production of the L-39 came to an end. Since the end of production, Aero Vodochody has developed several improved variants of the L-39 to take its place, and has continued extensive support and overhaul operations for existing L-39 customers.

One of the replacements for the L-39 Albatros was the Aero L-159 ALCA, a modernised version of the L-39. Originally, Aero Vodochody had intended to develop the L-159 in partnership with Elbit, but the Czech Ministry of Defense instead selected Rockwell Collins to partner on the program. The limited success of the L-159 led Aero to announce at the 2014 Farnborough Airshow that it was developing an upgraded version of the L-39, designated L-39NG (Skyfox), to compete with the Alenia Aermacchi M-346 and British Aerospace Hawk. The L-39 Skyfox replaces the AI-25 turbofan with a Williams FJ44 engine; the airframe is modified, the wingtip fuel tanks being eliminated, and a new suite of avionics will be provided. The first flight of the L-39 Skyfox was in December 2018, and final military type certification was granted by the Czech Military Aviation Authority in 2022. The first production L-39NG is expected to fly by the end of 2022.

== Design ==
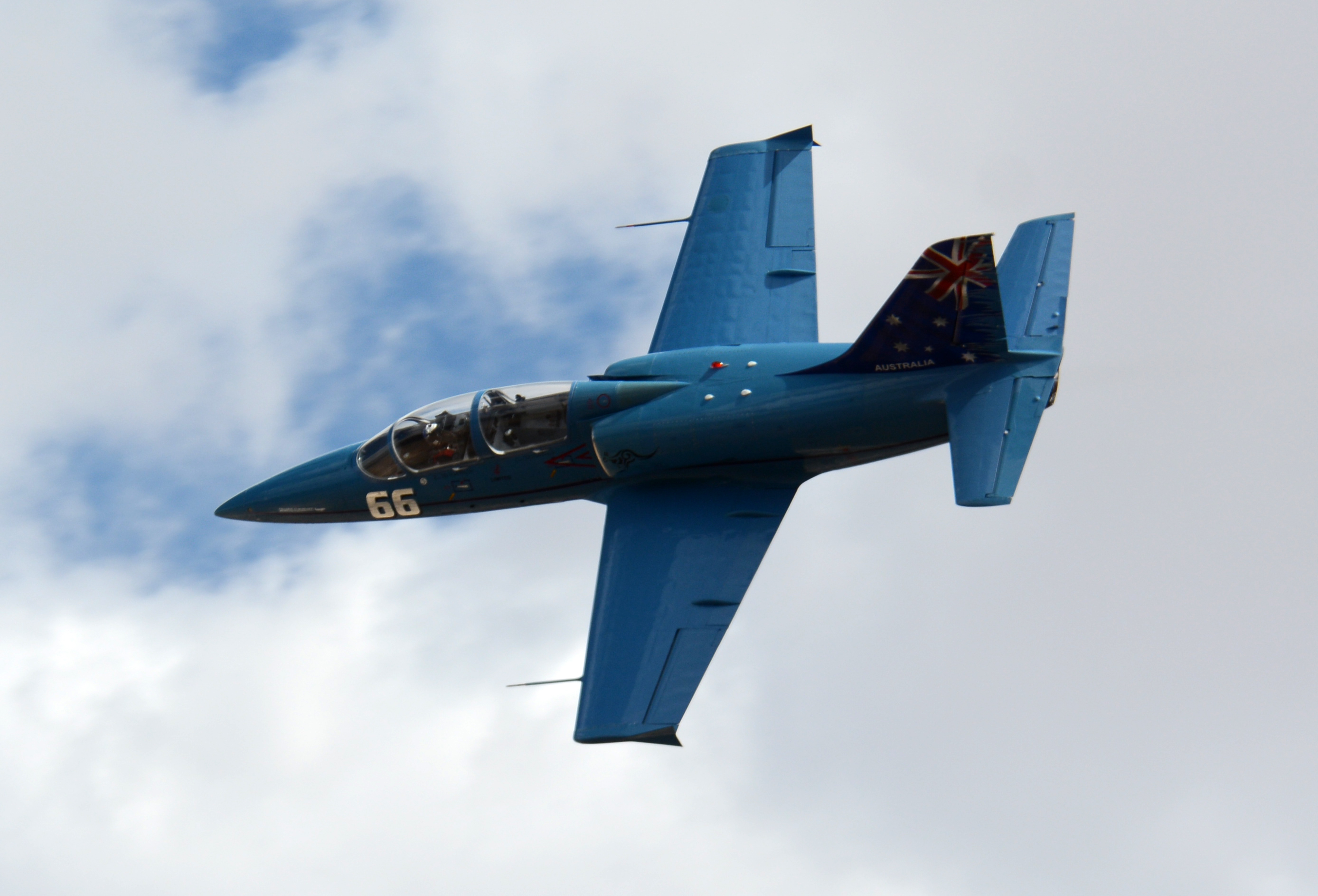
An L-39 at the 2014 Reno Air Race

The L-39 Albatros was designed to be a cost-effective jet-powered trainer aircraft, which is also capable of performing ground attack missions. For operational flexibility, simplicity, and affordability, the majority of onboard systems have been simplified to avoid incurring high levels of maintenance, as well as to minimize damage caused by mishandling when flown by inexperienced air crew. It could be readily flown from austere airstrips such as frozen lakebeds, enabled through the rugged design of the landing gear and favourable low landing speeds. The aircraft's flying qualities are reportedly simple, which is made easier by way of a rapid throttle response, making it easier for students who had never previously flown a jet aircraft before to successfully control. As a training platform, the L-39 itself comprised part of a comprehensive system that also used flight simulators and mobile ground test equipment.

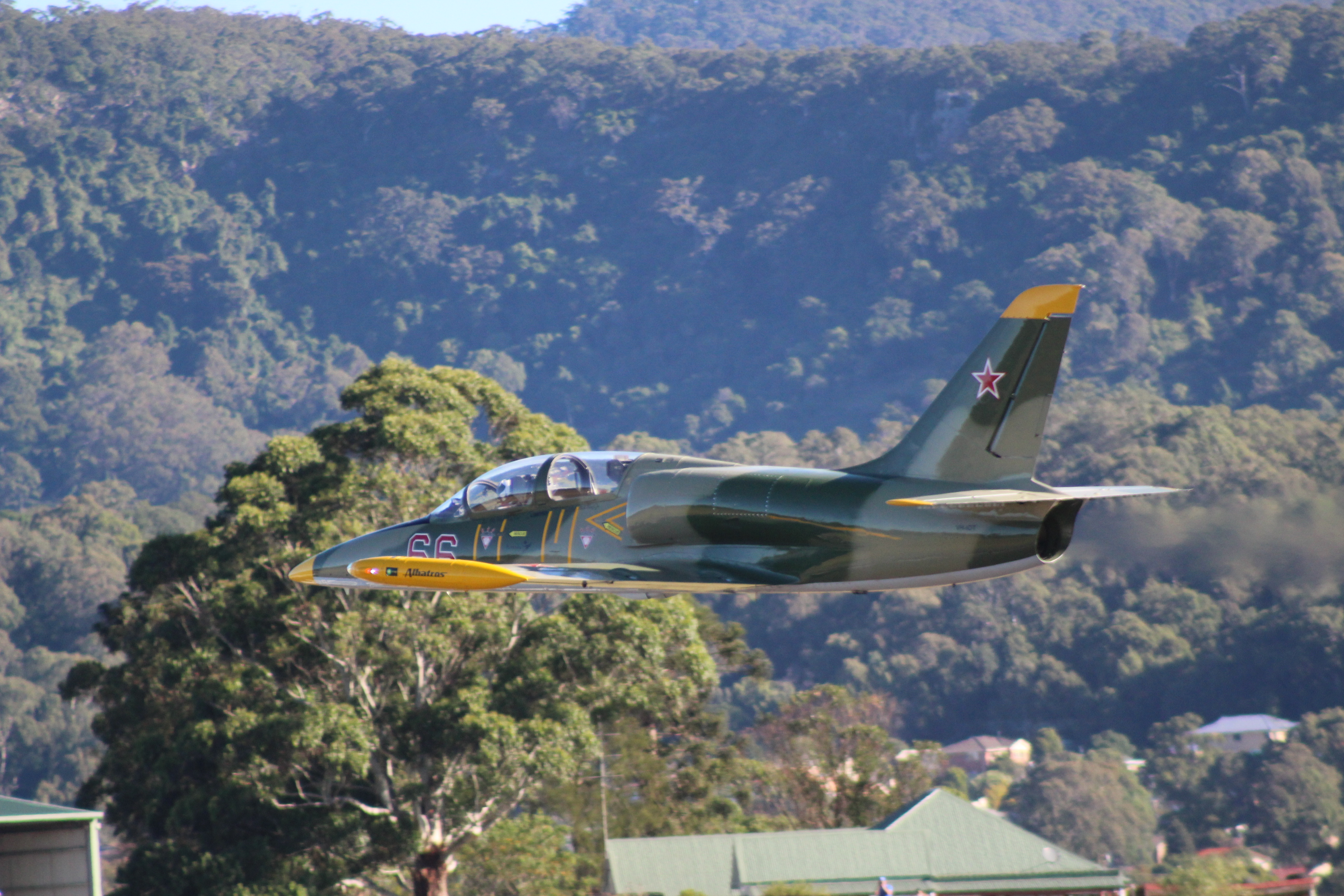
An L-39C Albatros at Wings over Illawarra in 2017

The low-set, straight wing has a double-taper planform, 2½-deg dihedral from the roots, a relatively low aspect ratio, and 100 litres (26 US gal; 22 imp gal) fuel tanks permanently attached to the wingtips. The trailing edge has double-slotted trailing edge flaps inboard of mass-balanced ailerons; the flaps are separated from the ailerons by small wing fences. An automatic trimming system was present, the flaps and the trim system being connected in order to counteract the potentially large pitch changes that would otherwise be generated by vigorous movements of the flaps. The tall, swept vertical tail has an inset rudder. Variable-incidence horizontal stabilizers with inset elevators are mounted at the base of the rudder and over the exhaust nozzle. Side-by-side airbrakes are located under the fuselage ahead of the wing's leading edge. The flaps, landing gear, wheel brakes and air brakes are powered by a hydraulic system. Controls are pushrod-actuated and have electrically powered servo tabs on the ailerons and rudder. Operational g-force limits at 4,200 kilograms (9,300 lb) are +8/-4 g.

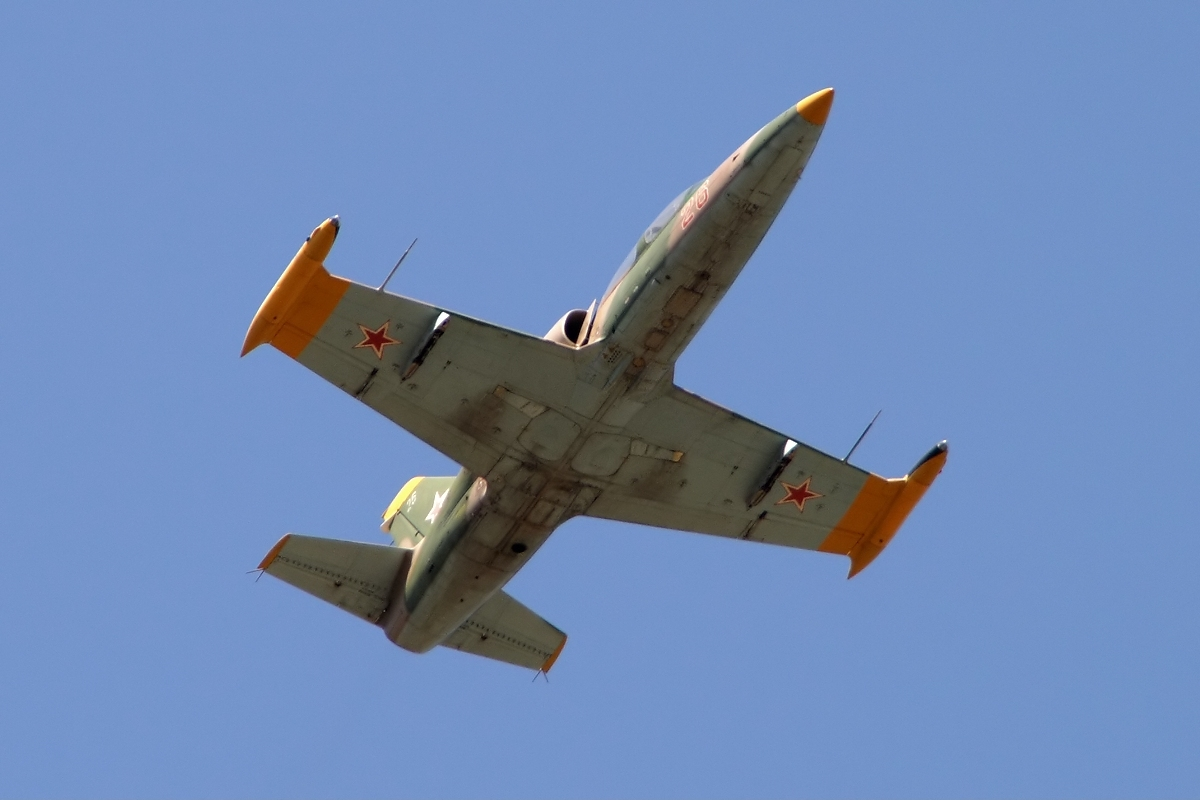
The underside of an L39 Albatros in-flight, 2008

A long, pointed nose leads back to the tandem cockpit, in which the student and instructor sit on Czech-built VS-1 ejection seats under individual canopies, which are opened manually and are hinged on the right. The rear seat, typically used by the instructor, is elevated slightly to readily enable observation and guidance of the student's actions in the forward position. The design of the cockpit, panel layout and many of its fittings resemble or are identical in function to those of other commonly used Soviet aircraft; for example, the procedure for deploying the ejection seat is exactly the same as for the Mikoyan MiG-29. The cockpit is partially pressurized, requiring the air crew to wear oxygen masks when flying in excess of 23,000 feet. A gyro gunsight for weapon-aiming purposes is typically present in the forward position only.

A single turbofan engine, an Ivchenko AI-25TL (made in the Soviet Union) is positioned in the rear fuselage, fed through shoulder-mounted, semi-circular air intakes (fitted with splitter plates) just behind the cockpit and the tailpipe below the horizontal tailplane. The engine has a time between overhaul (TBO) of 1,000 flight hours; it is allegedly cheaper than the majority of turbine engines to overhaul. Five rubber bag fuel tanks are located in the fuselage behind the cockpit. Several heavy radio units are typically installed in an aft avionics bay; these are often removed on civilian-operated aircraft and replaced with a 70-gallon fuel tank. Additional fuel tanks can be fitted in the rear cockpit position and externally underneath the wings; the tip-tanks can also be expanded for a greater fuel capacity.

The aircraft is fitted with a hydraulically actuated retractable nosewheel undercarriage that is designed to allow operation from grass airfields. The main landing gear legs retract inward into wing bays while the nose gear retracts forward. The basic L-39C trainer has provision for two underwing pylons for drop tanks or practice weapons, but these are not usually fitted. It can be armed with a pair of K-13 missiles to provide a basic air defense capability. Light-attack variants have four underwing hardpoints for ground attack stores, while the ZA variant also has an underfuselage gun pod. Mock UB-16 rocket pods can also be installed for visual appearance only.

== Operational history ==
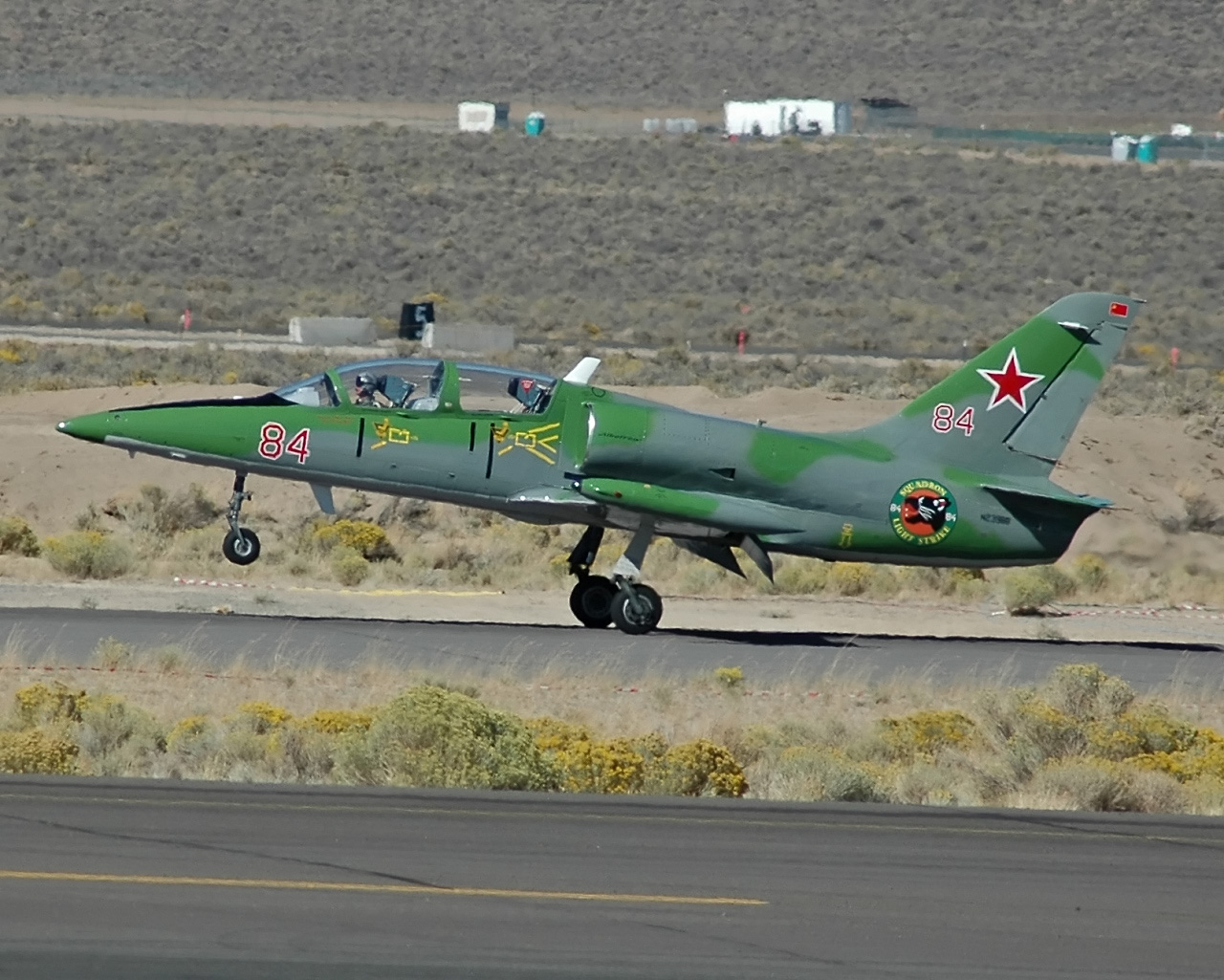
Civil L-39 in fictional Soviet 84th Light Strike Squadron markings

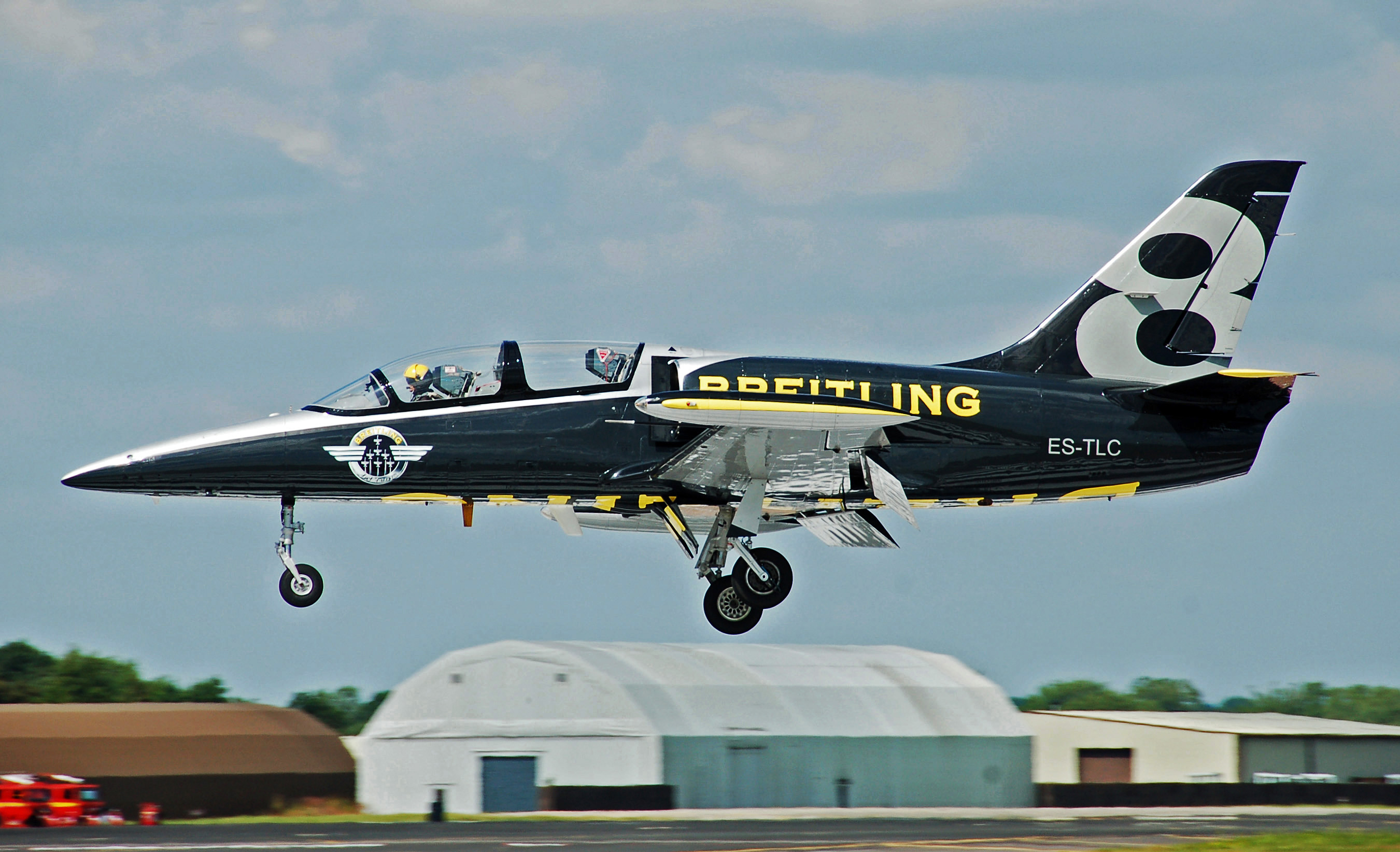
L-39 of the Breitling Jet Team

=== Georgia ===
During the War in Abkhazia (1992–1993), Abkhaz separatist forces received several L-39s from Russia and Chechnya, which were used in combat against Georgian forces. On 10 January 1993, an Abkhaz L-39 was shot down by a Russian SA-11 Buk during a friendly-fire incident. The pilot, Oleg Chanba, who was commander of the Abkhaz separatist air force, was killed during the incident. On 1 April 1993, during the attack on civilian targets in Sokhumi, Georgian forces managed to damage an L-39, which fell into the sea.

In the spring of 2008, a number of Georgian drones were shot down by Abkhazian separatist forces over the Abkhazia region. The Abkhazian separatist forces claimed that one of its missile-equipped L-39s had shot down a Georgian Hermes 450 unmanned reconnaissance drone. Footage released later by Georgian authorities clearly shows a drone being brought down by a heat-seeking missile fired from a MiG-29. A UN investigation also concluded that the footage was authentic and that the drone was shot down by a Russian MiG-29 using a Vympel R-73 heat seeking missile.

=== Afghanistan ===
The Taliban Air Force had managed to obtain around five L-39C aircraft from the remnants of the former Democratic Republic of Afghanistan Air Force; with foreign technical support and pilots, these were placed into combat operations during the later stages of the 1996–2001 phase of the Afghan civil war against the Northern Alliance. In early 2001, only two of these reportedly remained operational. Following the United States invasion of Afghanistan in 2001, a number of L-39s were inducted into the Afghan Air Force.

=== Azerbaijan ===
A number of L-39s, along with older L-29s, were used extensively by Azeri forces to perform ground attack missions during the First Nagorno-Karabakh War in the 1980s and early 1990s. A number of these were reportedly shot down by air defenses employed by the Nagorno-Karabakh Defense Army. In September 2015, Aero Vodochody sought a large order for the latest model of the L-39 to Azerbaijan; by this point, Azerbaijan had a total of 24 airworthy L-39s remaining in service.

=== Chechnya ===
The newly de facto independent Chechen Republic of Ichkeria found itself with dozens of L-39s (as well as several L-29s, three MiG-17s, two MiG-15UTIs, helicopters and other transport and civilian aircraft) left at Khankala and Kalinovskaya airbases by the Soviet Air Force in 1992. Most of these, however, were reportedly abandoned or not in flyable condition, but during the August–November 1994 conflict between nationalist and pro-Russian forces L-39s were deployed and were possibly one of the few air attack (and possibly reconnaissance) elements on Dzhokhar Dudayev's forces. At least one was reported as shot down near Goragorsk on October 4 by a Strela-2 MANPADS fired by Doku Zavgayev's pro-Russian militia. The pilot, Col. Ali Musayev and the co-pilot Dedal Dadayev were killed.

One of the main reasons that prompted the first Su-25 air raids that destroyed the Chechen air force on the ground, and started the Russian intervention, was preparations being made by Dudayev's air force, which had been spotted by reconnaissance Sukhoi Su-24MRs. There were fears that these aircraft could slow or deter the Russian air and ground campaign, as well as the capability of several aircraft to conduct kamikaze attacks on Russian nuclear power plants (specifically via means of the ejection seat in most aircraft, notably the L-39, by filling them with explosives to act as improvised cruise missiles).

=== Iraq ===
Iraq became the first export customer for the L-39 Albatros. By mid 1970, the Iraqi Air Force had procured a considerable number of L-39 trainers, having transferred the bulk of their training activities onto the Czechoslovak aircraft. During the American-led invasion of Iraq in 2003, on 14 April 2003, a pair of United States Navy McDonnell Douglas F/A-18 Hornets bombed several L-29 and L-39 aircraft on the ground at an airfield near the city of Tikrit; these had been believed to have been modified to perform as delivery platforms for weapons.

=== Libya ===
Libya acquired some 180 L-39ZOs around 1978, which served at Sabha and Okba Ben Nafi flying schools along with Yugoslav-made G-2 Galeb for advanced jet training and Italian-made SF.260s (for primary training).

The L-39s were deployed during the Chadian-Libyan conflict, mainly to Ouadi Doum air base. During the final Chadian offensive in March 1987, the Chadians captured Ouadi Doum along with several aircraft (11 L-39s included) and Soviet SAM systems and tanks. A Chadian report to the UN, reported the aforementioned capture on 11 L-39s and the destruction (or downing) of at least four of them.

In the midst of that conflict, on 21 April 1983, three LARAF Ilyushin Il-76TDs and one Lockheed C-130 Hercules landed at Manaus Airport, Brazil after one of the Il-76s developed technical problems while crossing the Atlantic Ocean. The aircraft were then searched by the Brazilian authorities: instead of medical supplies – as quoted in the transport documentation – the crate of the first of 17 L-39s bound for Nicaragua together with arms and parachutes, to support the country's war against US-backed Contras, were found. The cargo was impounded for some time before being returned to Libya, while the transports were permitted to return to their country. During the 1990s and 2000s, Libya made multiple attempts to get components and services for its air force in spite of an embargo placed upon the country by United Nations Security Council Resolution 748; by 2001, only half of Libya's L-39s were serviceable as a consequence.

=== Russia ===
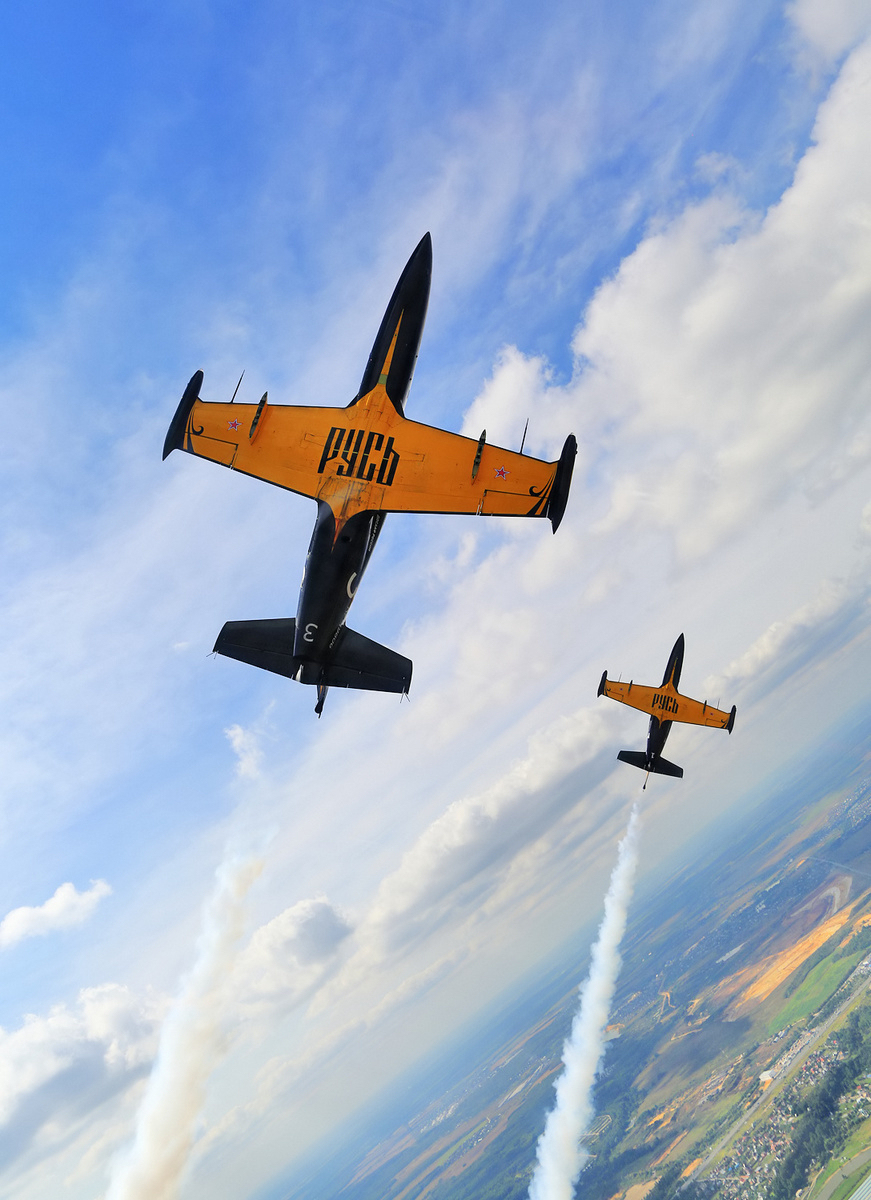
Pair of Russian L-39s performing an aerobatic demonstration at the 2015 MAKS air show

Following the dissolution of the Soviet Union and the formation of the Russian Air Force in 1991, the newly formed service found itself with hundreds of L-39 aircraft, the majority of which were surplus to their training requirements. According to author Stephan Wilkinson, by 2005, Russia was seeking to potentially sell up to 800 of their L-39s, which were receiving only a basic level of maintenance once per month while their fate was being decided. Starting in the early 1990s, the Russian Air Force has pursued the development of a domestically built jet trainer, for which the Yakovlev Yak-130 was selected; the Yak-130 shall eventually replace the L-39 in Russian service within its operational roles.

=== Syria ===
The Syrian Arab Air Force has operated a number of armed L-39ZA light attack variants. Since the early stages of the Syrian civil war, the Syrian Air Force's L-39 aircraft have been routinely deployed in counter-insurgency operations against various rebel ground forces, a number of these aircraft have also been shot down by ground fire. They were first used operationally during the Battle of Aleppo, launching several strikes upon rebel-held positions. It has been claimed the L-39 was the first fixed-wing aircraft to be employed against the rebels.

In February 2013, insurgents successfully captured a number of intact L-39s, along with their support equipment, after raiding and later taking over the Al-Jarrah airbase. In late 2013, reports emerged of claims by Islamist fighters that they had successfully flown two of the captured L-39s. In October 2014, the Syrian Government claimed that at least two rebel-held L-39s had been airworthy and had recently been destroyed by Syrian Air Force aircraft.

According to Reuters, by 2014, the L-39 had allegedly become one of the favoured platforms of the Syrian Air Force for performing ground attack missions due to its slower speed and higher agility over other aircraft in its inventory. In December 2015, following the securing of the Kweiris airbase by government forces, the resumption of ground-attack missions by L-39s in the vicinity of Aleppo commenced shortly thereafter.

On 26 December 2017, a Syrian L-39 was shot down near Hama airport.

On 3 March 2020, a Syrian Arab Army Air Force L-39 was shot down by a Turkish Air Force F-16 over Idlib province. Both Syrian and Turkish forces confirmed the downing.

During the Northwestern Syria offensive (2024), some L-39s were captured by Syrian opposition forces after the capture of Aleppo.

=== Ukraine ===
On 24 February 2022, a Ukrainian L-39 from the 39th Tactical Aviation Brigade (Ukraine) piloted by Dmytro Kolomiyets was shot down by a Russian aircraft in Khmelnytskyi during the opening hours of the Russian invasion of Ukraine. On 9 August 2022, Dmytro Kolomiyets was posthumously awarded with the Order of the Gold Star.

On 25 August 2023, two Ukrainian L-39s collided during a combat mission over Zhytomyr, killing three pilots. Among those killed was combat pilot Andrii Pilshchykov, an Order of Courage recipient more commonly known by his callsign "Juice", who had become famous in the west for his articulate appeals early in the war for allies to supply F-16s to Ukraine.

=== Civilian use ===
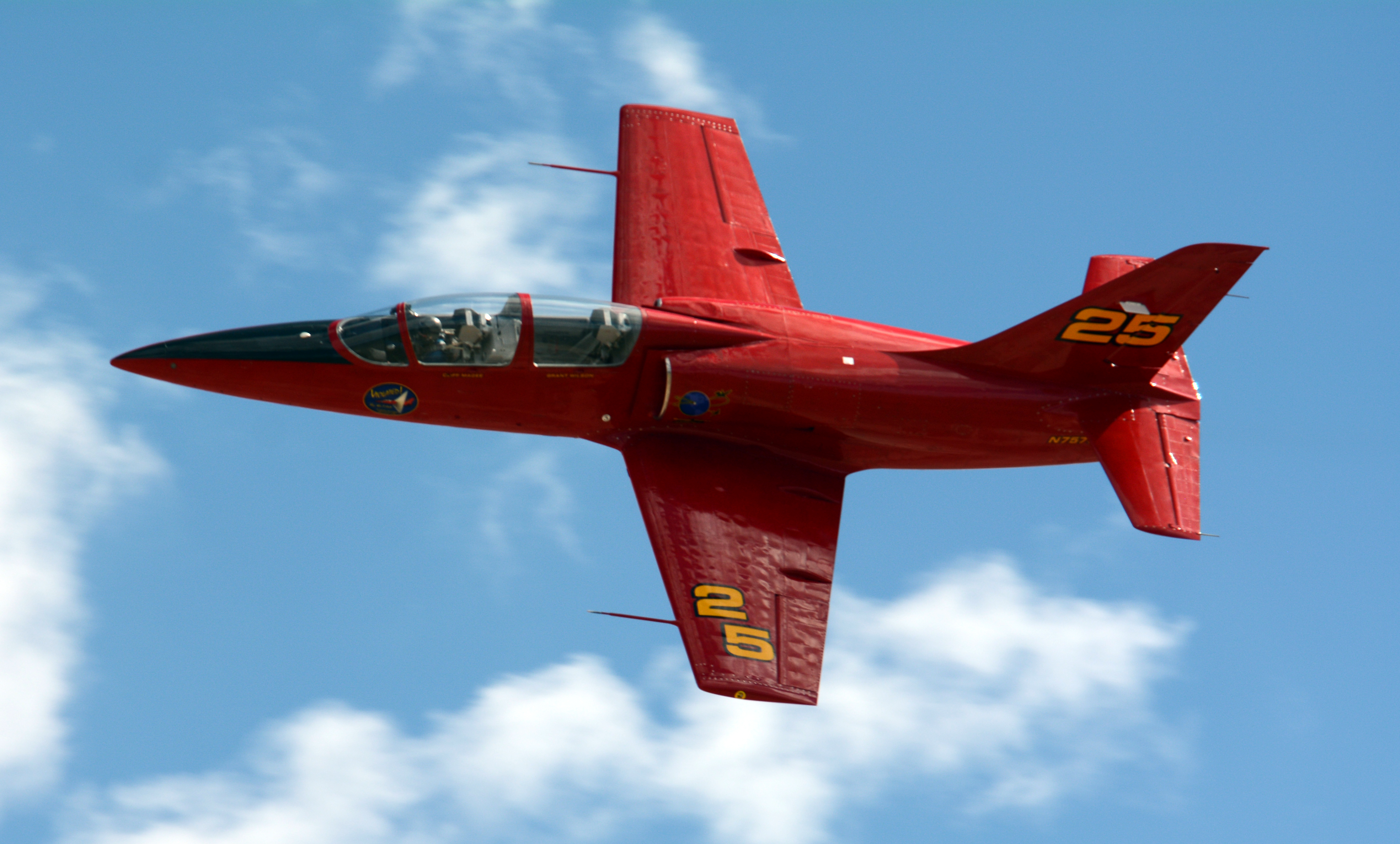
An L-39 at the 2014 Reno Air Race

While newer versions are now replacing older L-39s in service, thousands remain in active service as trainers, and many are finding new homes with private warbird owners all over the world. It has been claimed that the L-39's desirability stems from it being "the only available second-generation jet trainer". This trend is particularly evident in the United States, where their $200,000–$300,000 price puts them in range of moderately wealthy pilots looking for a fast, agile personal jet. Their popularity led to a purely L-39 Jet class being introduced at the Reno Air Races in 2002, though it has since been expanded to include other, similar aircraft.

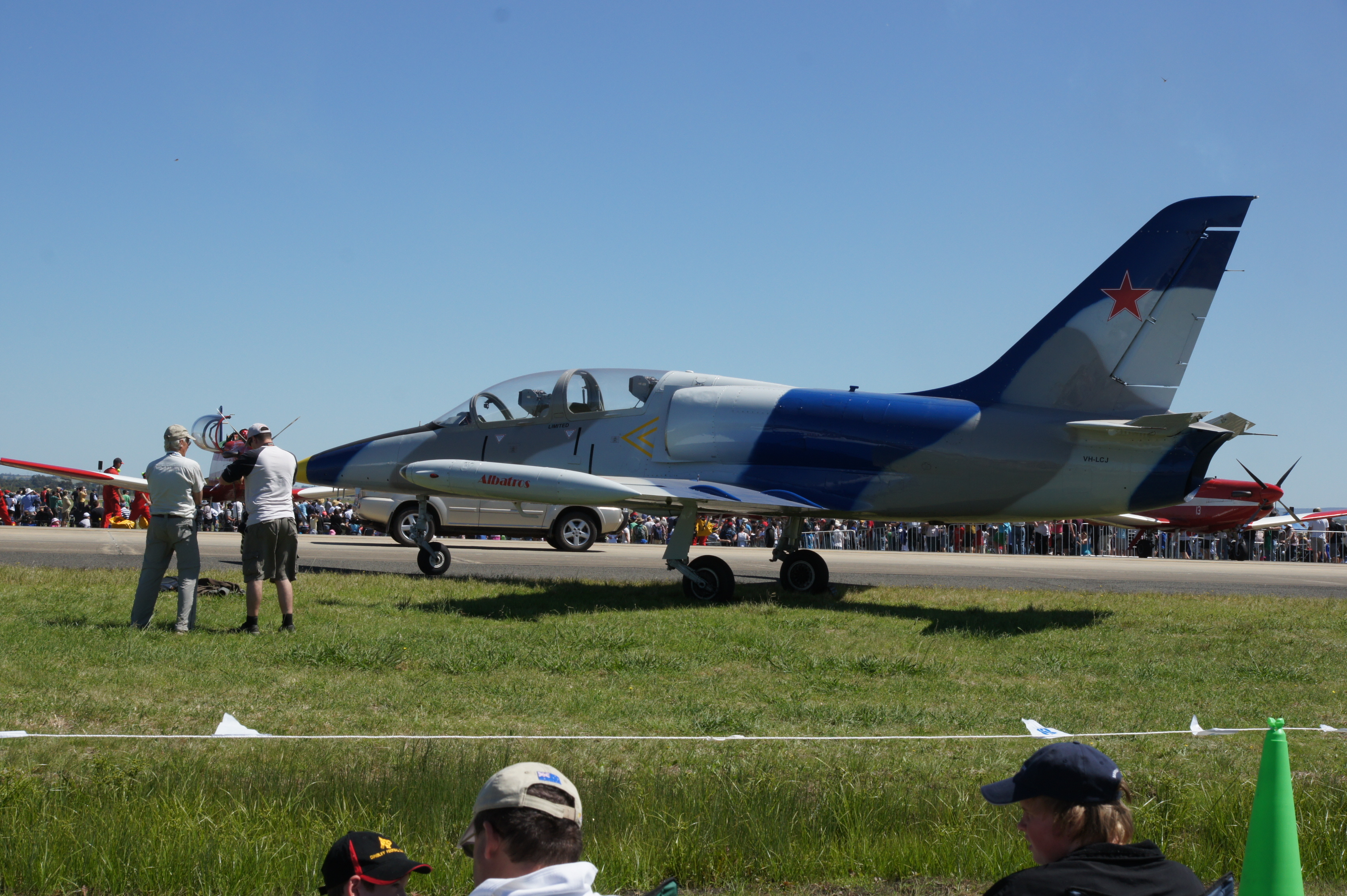
A civilian owned L-39 in Australia in 2011

In September 2012, there were 255 L-39s registered with the U.S. Federal Aviation Administration and four registered with Transport Canada. Several display teams use the L-39 such as the Patriots Jet Team (6 L-39s), the Breitling Jet Team (7 L-39s) and the Black Diamond Jet Team (5 L-39s). There are also several L-39s that have been made available for private jet rides by various operators in Australia, Czech Republic, France, Germany, Spain and the US. These L-39s are mostly in private hands, but some also belong to government agencies, such as those in Vyazma, Russia. In March 2018 there were five L-39s on the civilian register in New Zealand. One registered as an L-39 and four others registered as L-39C.

Since 2004, the Defence & MRO Division of Aero Vodochody has performed a general maintenance, repair and modernisation program of civil-operated L-39s, as well as performing the demilitarisation of ex-military aircraft. Services offered to civil operators include life-extension programs, support for civil registration/certification, training of ground/flight crew, logistics and analysis, customization, routine inspection, condition-based maintenance support, and providing general expertise/consultancy work.

== Variants ==
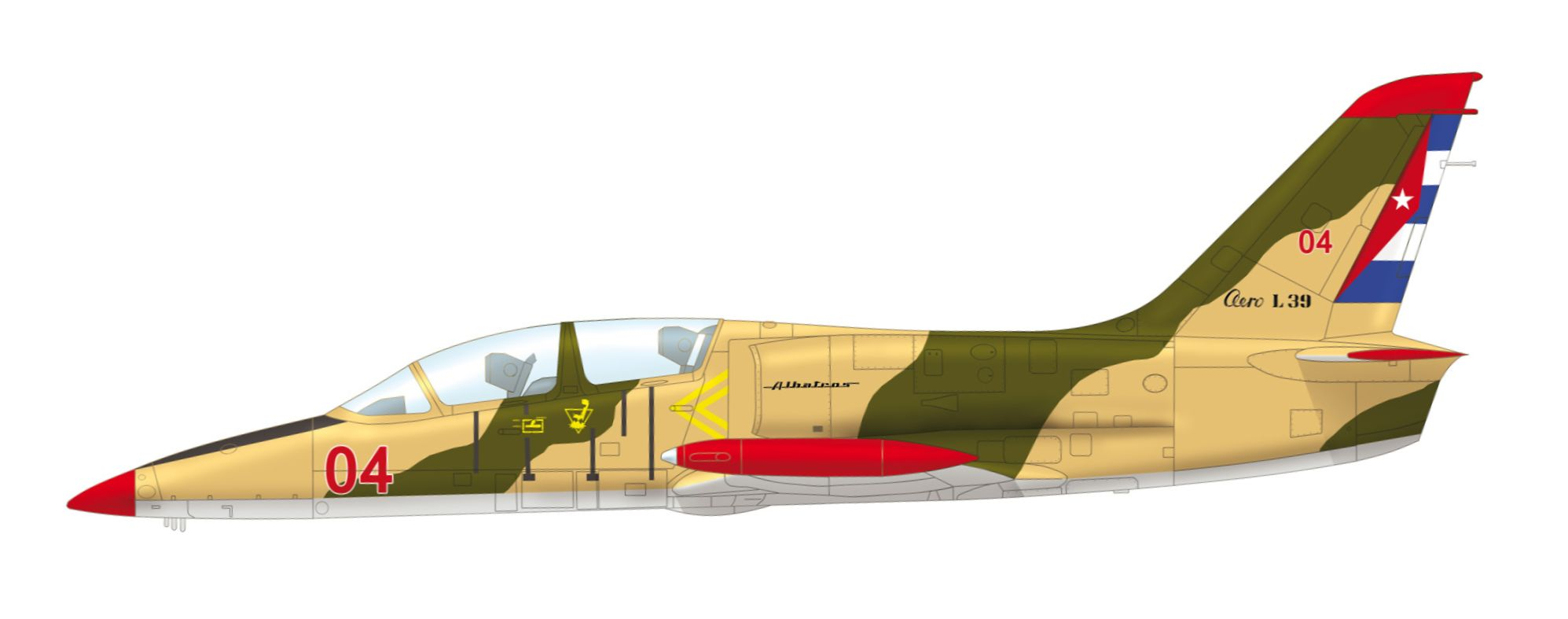
Aero L-39C Albatros, Cuban Revolutionary Air and Air Defense Force

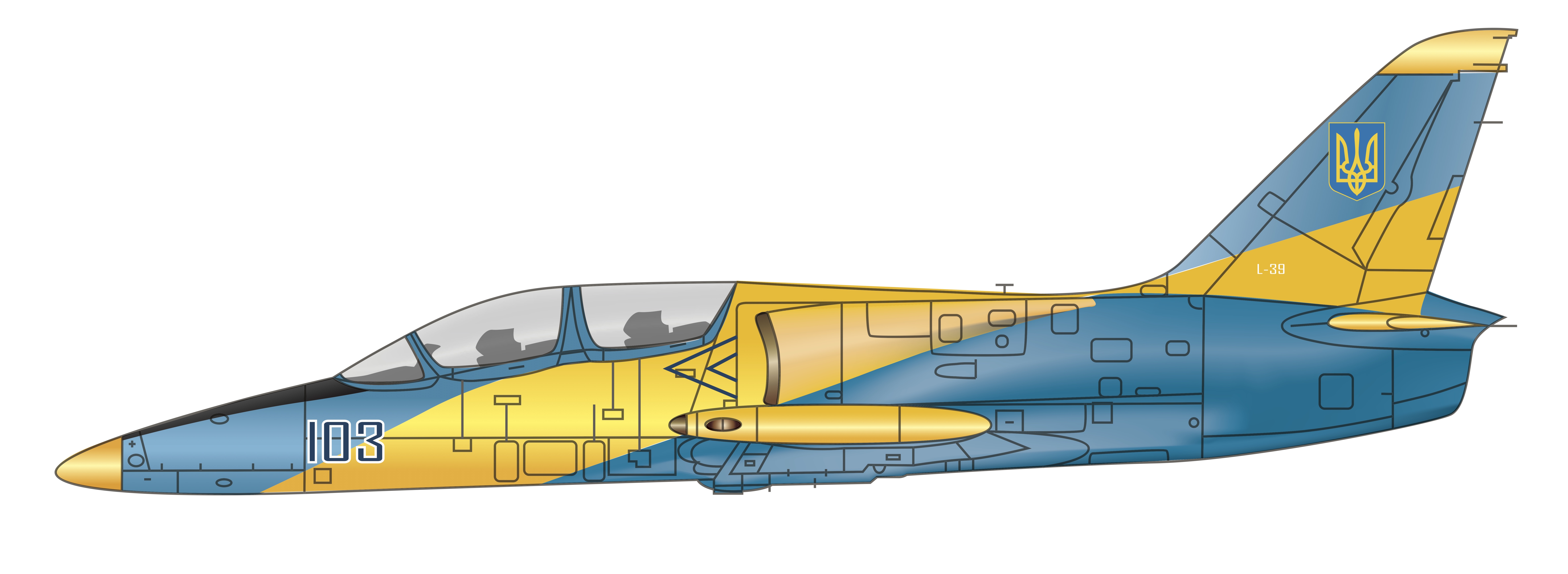
Aero L-39C Albatros ( "103 BLUE"), Ukrainian Air Force

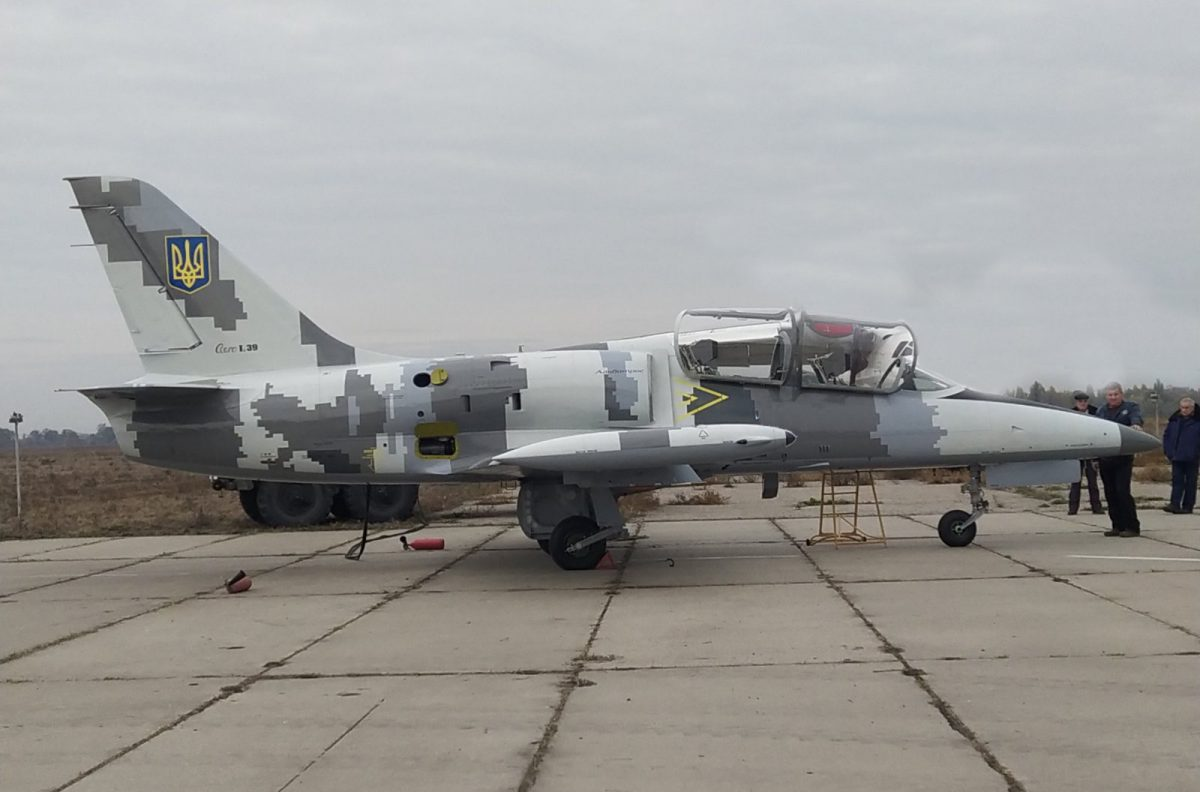
Aero L-39M1 Albatros, Ukrainian Air Force

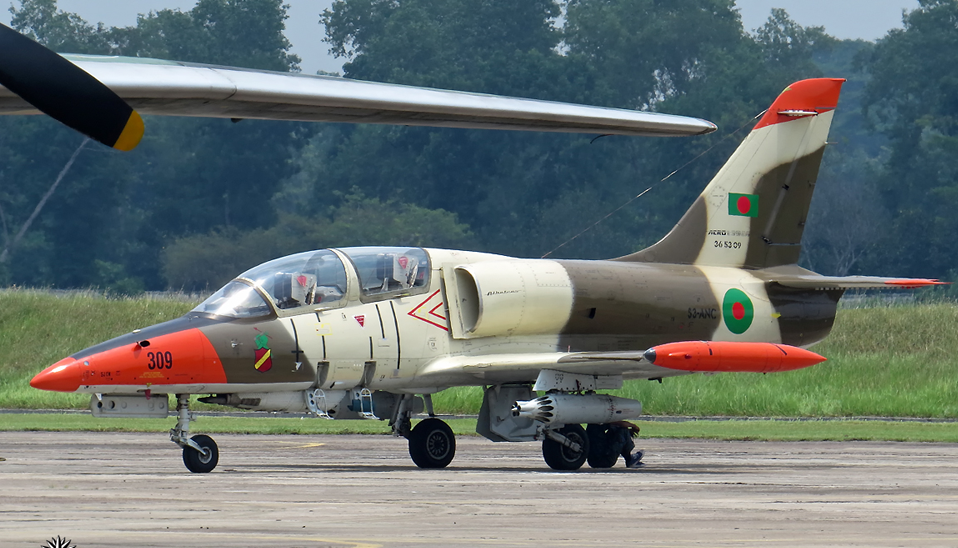
Bangladesh Air Force L-39ZA. Armed with GSh-23L cannon and Rocket pods

L-39X-01 – X-07
Five prototypes plus two static test airframes.
L-39C (C for Cvičná – training)
Standard basic trainer for Soviet Union, Czechoslovakia and export. Originally designated L-39, but renamed L-39C when later variants appeared. Two pylons under wing. Approximately 2,260 built.
L-39CM (CM for Cvičná modernizovaná – modernised training)
Slovak upgraded C version.
L-39M1
Ukrainian upgraded C version with AI-25TLSh engines. The conversion is carried out by Odesaviaremservis and the first plane was ready in 2009. The upgrade of a further 7 L-39C's was planned. Only six L-39C were converted into L-39M1 by 2014
L-39V (V for Vlečná – tug)
Single-seat target tug version for Czechoslovakia. Equipped to tow KT-04 target on 1,700 m (5,600 ft) cable. Prototype plus eight production aircraft built
L-39ZO (Z for Zbraně – weapons)
Interim weapon trainer variant for export. Four pylons stressed for 500 kg (1,100 lb) (inboard) and 250 kg (550 lb) (outboard), with total external load of 1,150 kg (2,500 lb). First flew 25 June 1975, with initial deliveries to Iraq in 1977. 337 built.
L-39ZA
Significantly upgraded L-39ZO for armed training and light attack, employing sturdier landing gear, a higher payload (total 1,290 kg (2,844 lb)) and notably provision for a GSh-23L 23-millimeter twin-barreled cannon attached in a conformal pod under the pilots' compartment, having a 150-round magazine within the airframe. Outer pylons wired to carry K-13 or R-60 air-to-air missiles. Two prototypes, with first flying on 29 September 1976. 208 aircraft delivered.
L-39ZAM
Slovak upgraded ZA version.
L-39ZA/ART
Thai version of L-39ZA with Elbit avionics. 40 built.
L-39MS/L-59
The Aero L-39MS is a second generation military trainer aircraft developed from the firm's earlier L-39. Compared to its predecessor, it featured a strengthened fuselage, longer nose, a vastly updated cockpit, and a more powerful (21.6 kN (4,850 lbf)) Lotarev DV-2 engine, allowing operation at higher weights and speeds (max speed 872 km/h (542 mph)). First flight on 30 September 1986. It was later designated as the Aero L-59.
L-139 Albatros 2000
Revised version with western avionics and 17.99 kN (4,045 lbf) Garrett TFE731-4-1T engine. Single prototype built.
L-159
Further modernised advanced trainer/combat aircraft with more modern, western avionics and Honeywell/ITEC F124 engine.
L-39 Skyfox
Modernised and upgraded version with Williams FJ44 engine, improved fuel system and avionics, planned to be introduced in 2018 under developmental name L-39NG.
B.KhF.1
(Thai: บ.ขฝ.๑) Royal Thai Air Force designation for the L-39ZA/ART.

=== Facsimiles ===
Skyleader markets a carbon-fibre ducted-fan powered variant called the UL-39 Albi. It was conceived by a group at Czech Technical University in Prague, and first flown in the Czech Republic on 4 April 2016.

== Operators ==
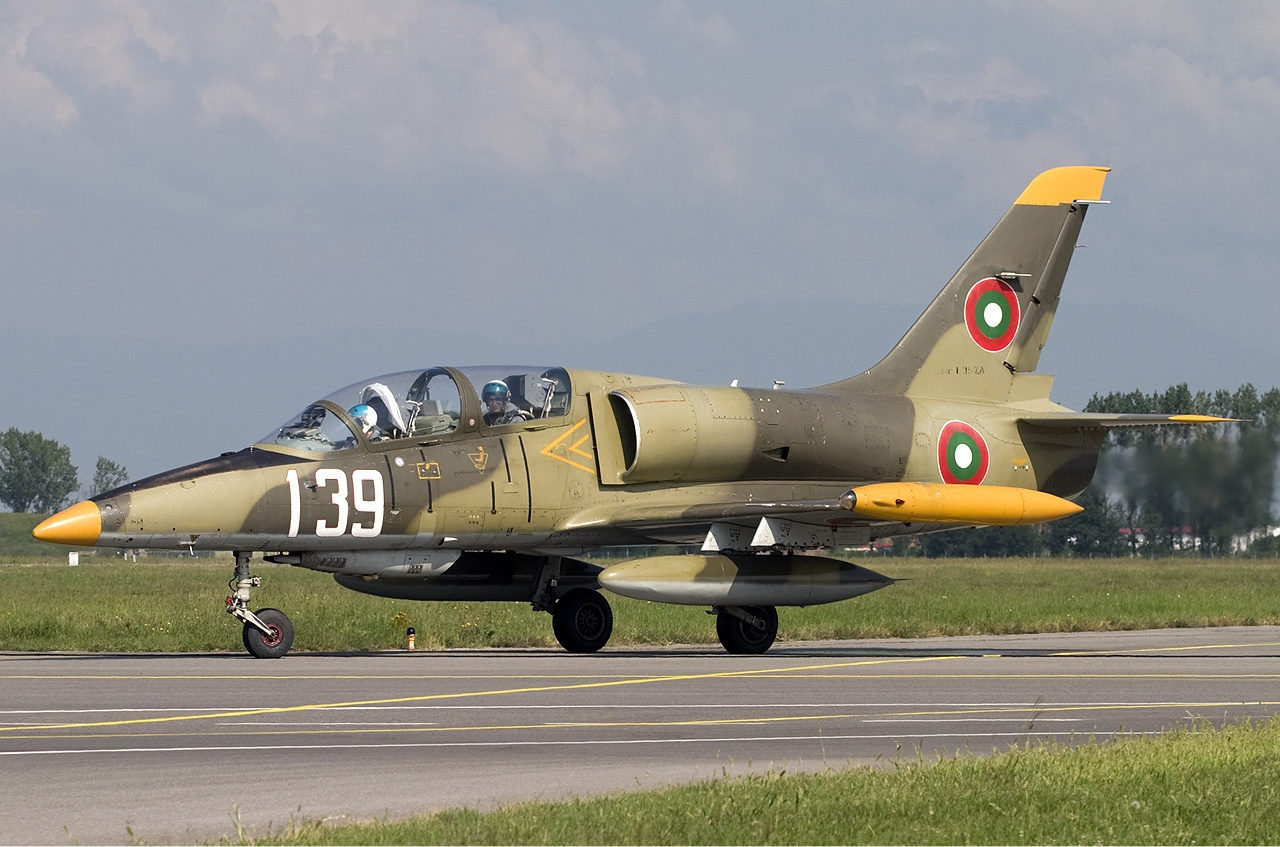
A Bulgarian Air Force L-39 Albatros

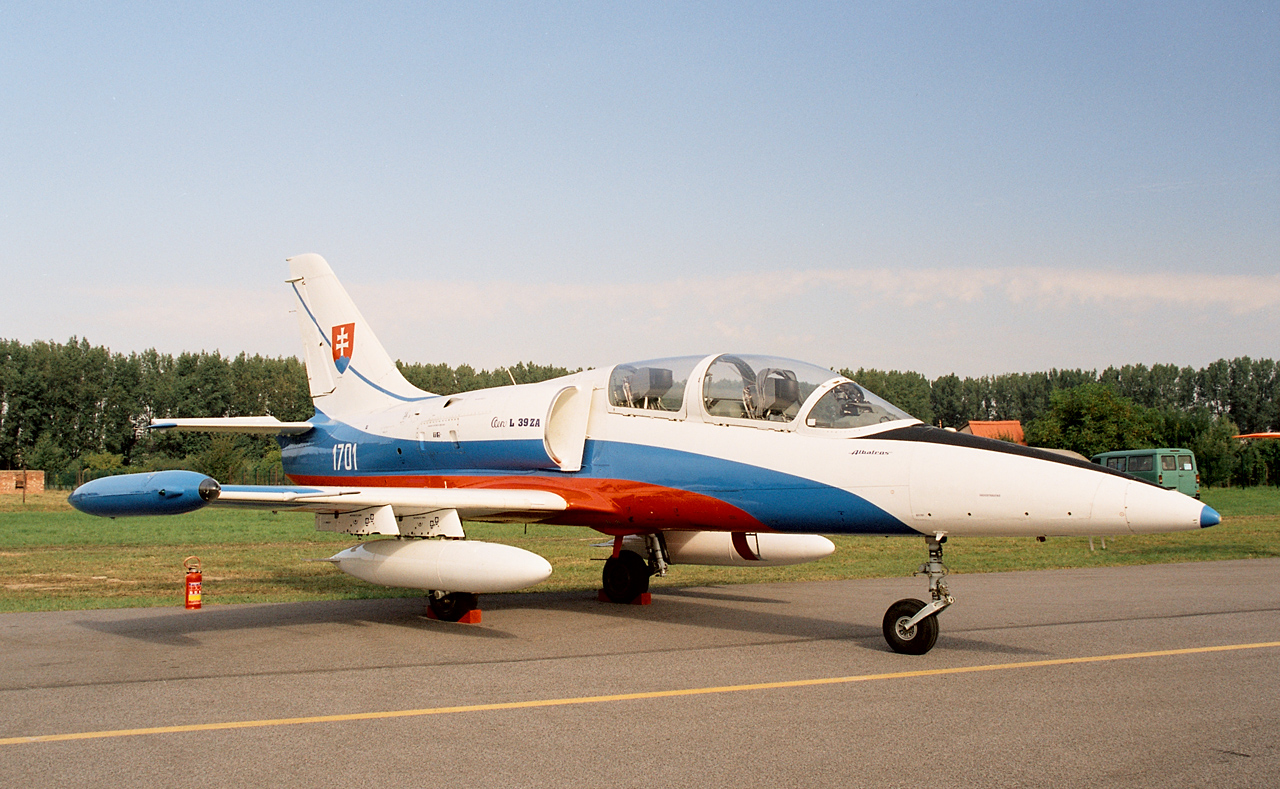
A Slovak L-39ZA (1701) in Biele Albatrosy colors at Radom Air Show 2005

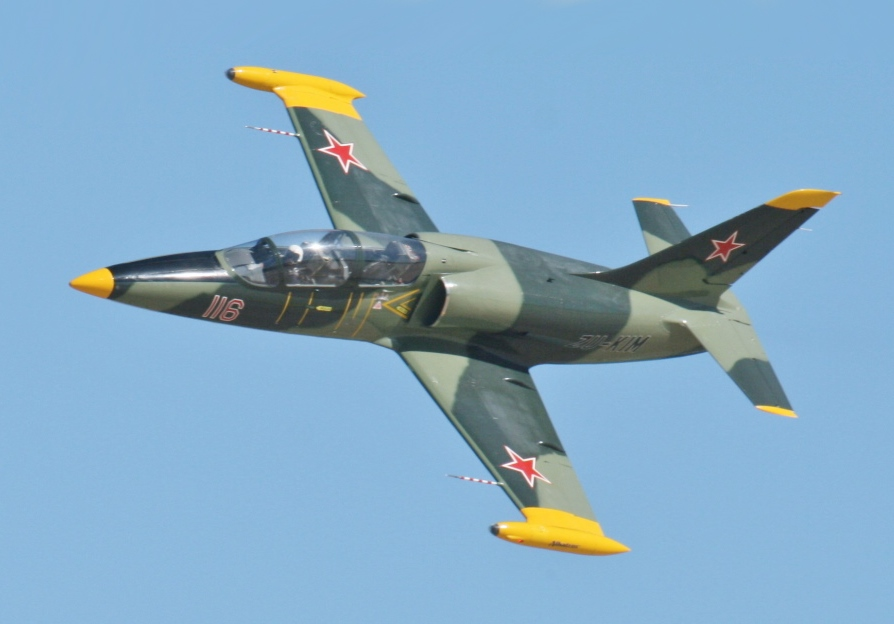
L-39C in civil use

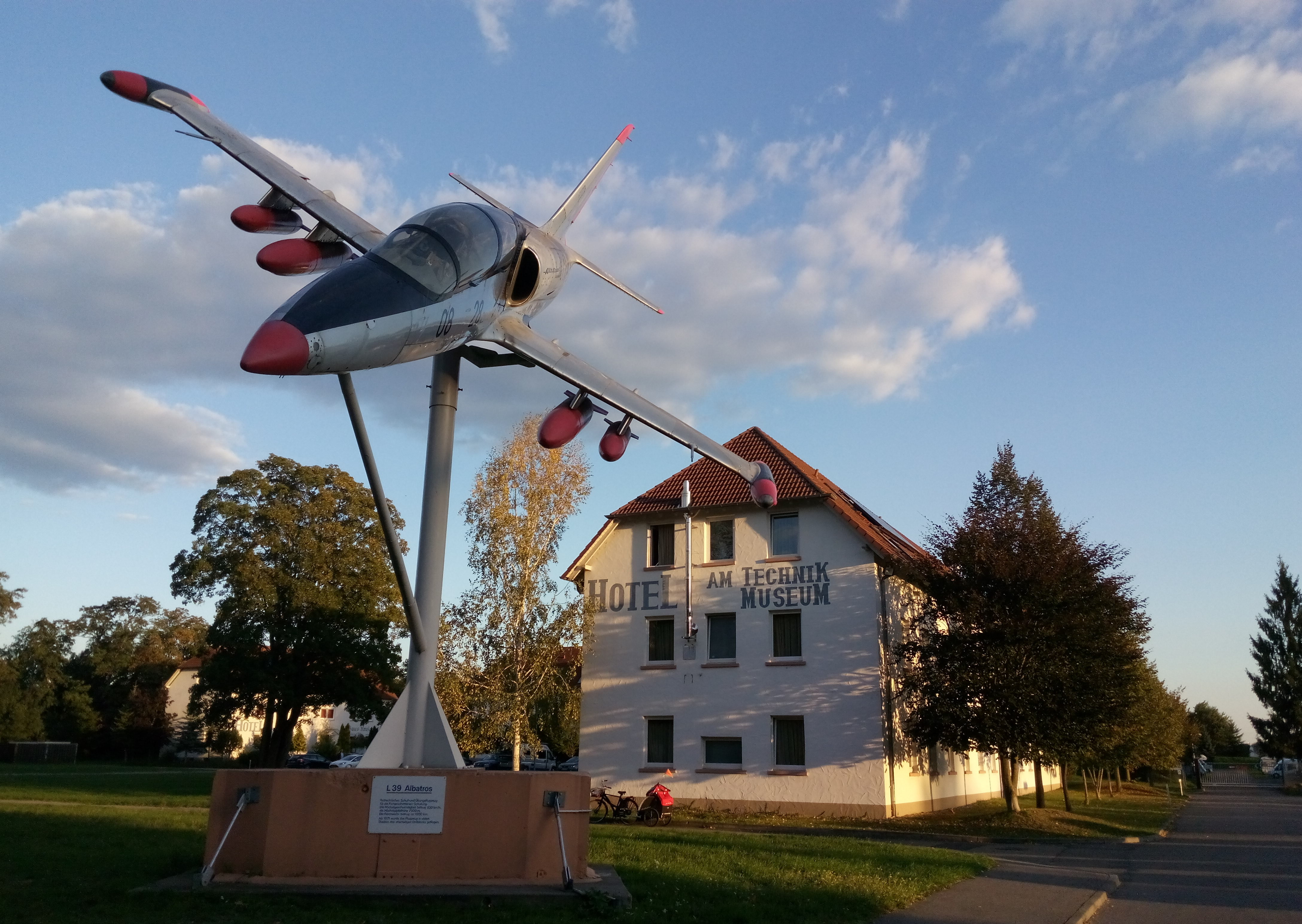
L-39ZO On display at Technik Museum Speyer hotel

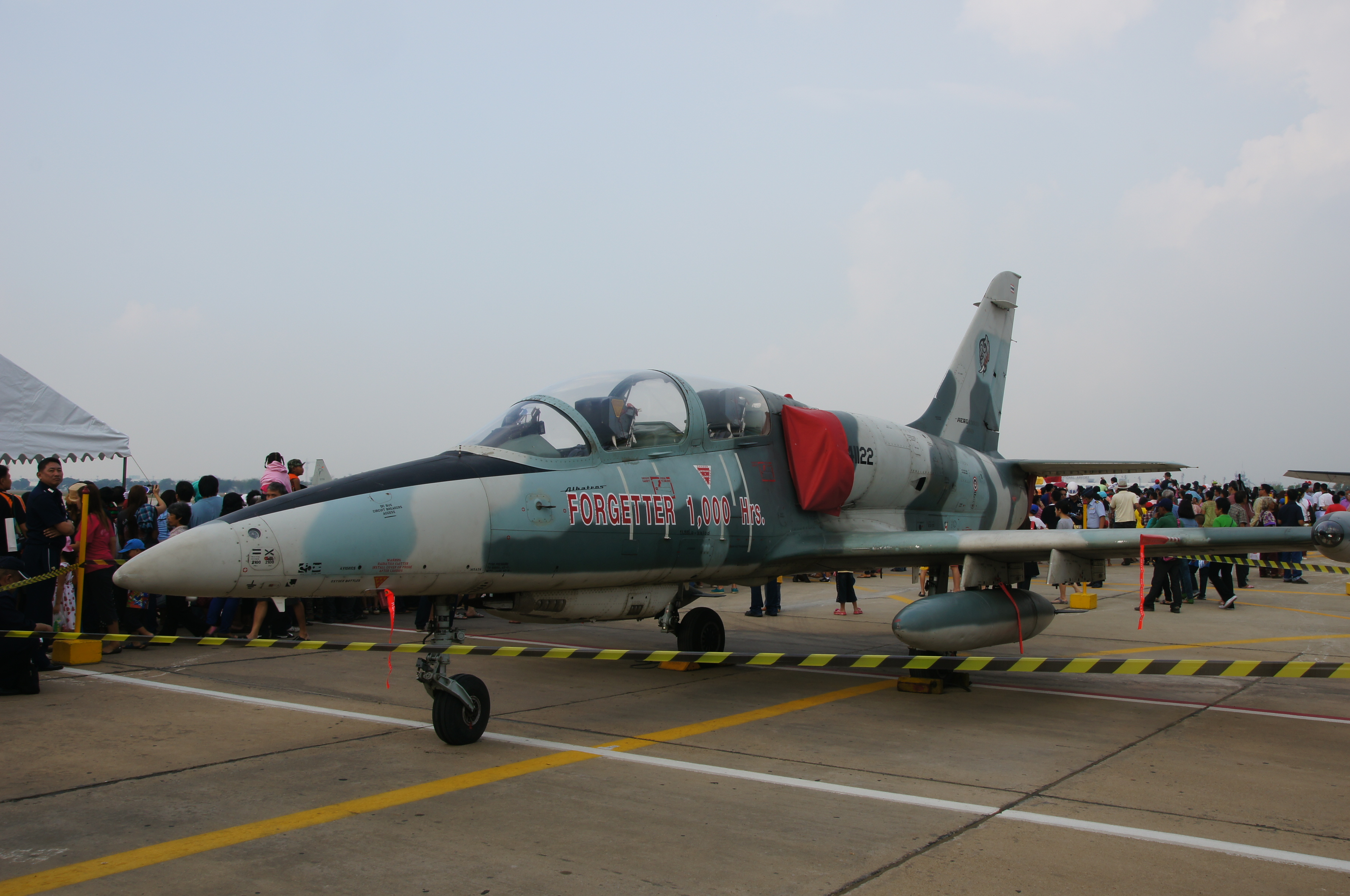
L-39 of the Royal Thai Air Force in 2013

=== Current operators ===
- Afghanistan
- Algeria
- Angola
- Armenia
- Azerbaijan
- Bangladesh
- Belarus
- Bulgaria 12 L-39ZA
- Central African Republic
- Cuba
- Czech Republic
- Egypt
- Equatorial Guinea
- Estonia
- Ethiopia
- France (The Breitling Jet Team currently uses nine L-39s)
- Georgia
- Ghana
- Hungary
- Kazakhstan
- Kyrgyzstan
- Libya
- Latvia (The Baltic Bees Jet Team currently uses six L-39s)
- Mali
- Mozambique
- Netherlands (AEC Skyline currently uses five known L-39s)
- Nigeria
- North Korea
- Romania
- Russia
- Slovakia
- South Sudan
- Syria (At least two L-39 were put into service as of July 2026)
- Tajikistan
- Tunisia
- Turkmenistan
- Uganda
- Ukraine
- United States (The Patriots Jet Team currently uses six L-39s; The Black Diamond Jet Team currently uses six L-39s)
- Uzbekistan
- Vietnam
- Yemen

=== Former operators ===
- Abkhazia
- Cambodia
- East Germany 50 L-39ZO, 2 L-39V. Withdrawn from use in 1990.
- Iraq 22 L-39C, 59 L-39ZO
- Lithuania (Transfer last L-39ZA Albatros light attack aircraft to Ukraine in 2024)
- Thailand L-39ZA/ART (Westernized version, equipped with Israeli avionics, retired in 2021)

== Notable accidents and incidents ==
- On 26 September 1987, Mihai Smighelschi, a 21-year-old student of the Romanian Air Force Academy, flew an L-39ZA trainer to Turkey and requested political asylum. His aircraft was later recovered and onboard data recorders showed that he had flown no higher than 150 m (490 ft) above ground at 700 km/h (430 mph) to evade radar detection. Smighelschi had less than 100 hours at the time, including high-school glider training, and less than 3 hours on the L-39ZA. Without satellite navigation or any maps, he had navigated a straight line over Romania, Bulgaria and Turkey using only ground marks and the memory of a map of Europe present at the Academy. He eventually landed in Kirklareli, Turkey, on a street near several jeeps that seemed to have American insignia, damaging the aircraft's front wheel and the nose.
- On 24 January 2001, Atlas Air Founder, Chairman, and CEO Michael A. Chowdry was killed when his L-39 crashed into an open field near Watkins, Colorado, US. Also killed was The Wall Street Journal aerospace reporter Jeff Cole. Chowdry and Cole were making a planned flight from Front Range Airport.
- On 2 June 2002, a brake failure on an L-39 landing at the Imperial War Museum Duxford caused the plane to run off the end of the runway and down an embankment onto the M11 motorway. The trainee pilot was killed when he ejected at ground level, but the instructor survived the accident and no vehicles on the motorway were involved.
- On 6 December 2015, an L-39 crashed while attempting to take-off at Apple Valley Airport, California, US; the pilot Mike Mangold and his passenger were both killed on impact, followed by an ensuing fire on the ground.
- On 26 August 2016, an L-39C of the Vietnam People's Air Force from the 910th Regiment crashed in Phú Yên province during a training exercise. One pilot, Phạm Đức Trung, died.
- On 11 July 2019, Squadron Leader Naruephol Lertkuson died, when their Royal Thai Air Force L-39ZA engines malfunctioned while making a return trip to the airfield Wing 41 located at Chiang Mai International Airport in Chiang Mai, the flying officer Theerawat Khoonkhunthod ejected safely only sustained minor injuries.
- On 25 August 2023, Major Andrii Pilshchykov died, along with two other pilots, Major Viacheslav Minka and Major Serhii Prokazin, when their two Ukrainian Air Force L-39M1 trainers collided in the air performing a whifferdill turn maneuver during dogfight training near Sinhury, Zhytomyr Oblast.
- On 13 September 2024, a Bulgarian Air Force L-39ZA crashed during an airshow rehearsal at Graf Ignatievo Air Base, Bulgaria. Both pilots Major Petko D. Dimitrov and 1st Lieutenant Vencislav A. Dunkin were killed on impact.
- On 22 July 2025, a privately owned L-39 crashed near Granite Falls, Minnesota, enroute from Alpine, Wyoming, to Fond Du Lac County, Wisconsin, shortly after reporting engine trouble. Pilot David C. Dacus was killed and pilot Mark R. Ruff was injured.

== Aircraft on display ==
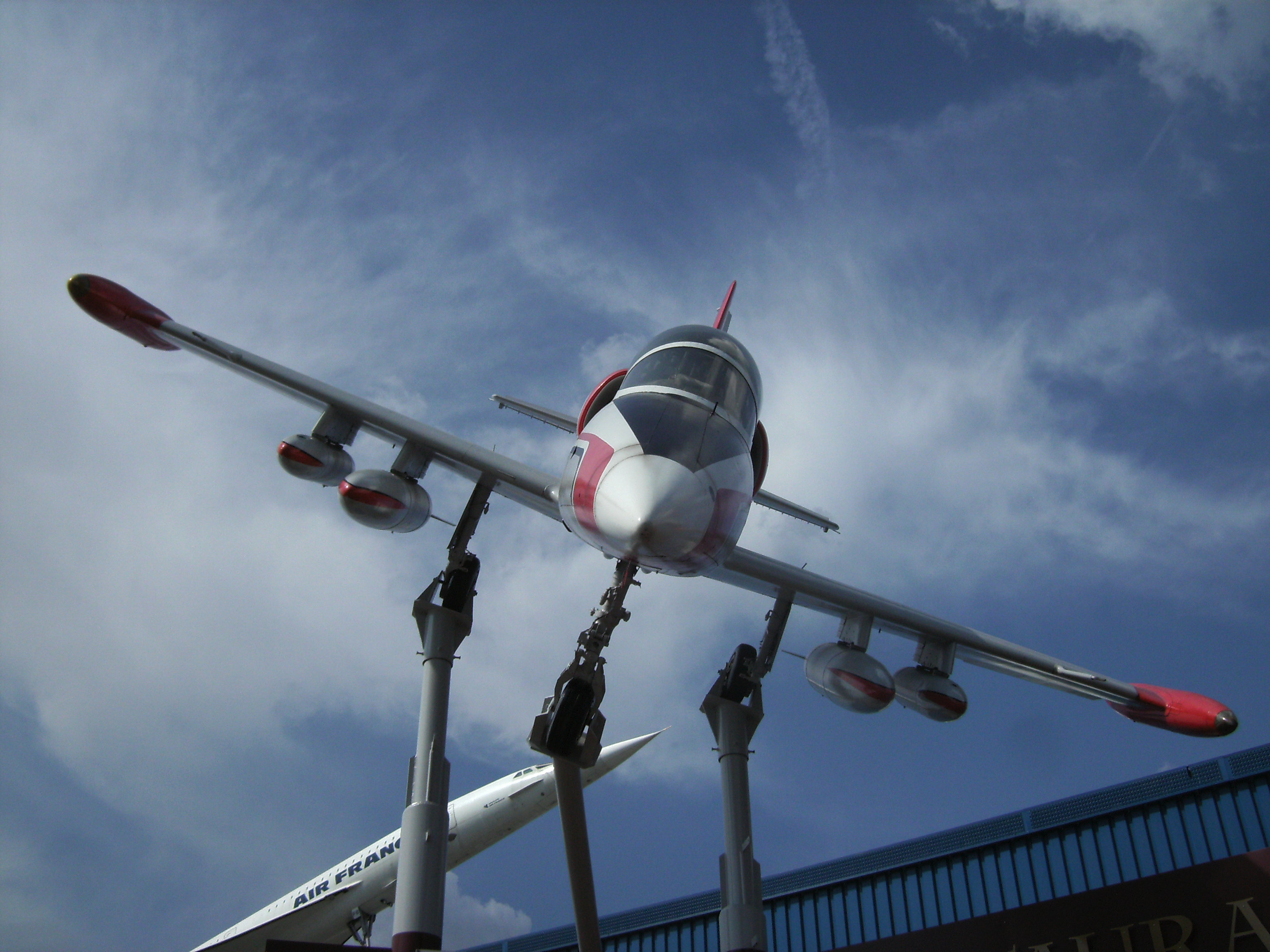
Aero L-39 mounted at the Auto & Technik Museum Sinsheim

Czech Republic

- 230107 – L-39C on static display at the National Technical Museum in Prague.
- 230108 – L-39C on static display at Caslav Air Base in Čáslav, Central Bohemia.

Germany

- Auto & Technik Museum Sinsheim

Lithuania

- 931531 – L-39C as 01 Blue on static display at the Lithuanian Aviation Museum in S. Darius and S. Girėnas Airport (EYKS) Kaunas.

United States

- 430405 – L-39C on static display at the Southern Museum of Flight in Birmingham, Alabama.
- 533526 – L-39C on static display at the Hiller Aviation Museum in San Carlos, California.
- 131907 – L-39C on static display at the Teton Aviation Center in Driggs, Idaho.
- 2314 – L-39ZO Airworthy and on rotating display at the Olympic Flight Museum in Olympia, Washington

== Specifications (L-39C) ==
Orthographically projected diagram of the Aero L-39 Albatros

Data from Jane's All The World's Aircraft 1988–89, Aero Vodochody

General characteristics

- Crew: 2
- Length: 12.13 m (39 ft 10 in)
- Wingspan: 9.46 m (31 ft 0 in)
- Height: 4.77 m (15 ft 8 in)
- Wing area: 18.8 m^{2} (202 sq ft)
- Airfoil: NACA 64A012 modified
- Empty weight: 3,455 kg (7,617 lb)
- Max takeoff weight: 4,700 kg (10,362 lb)
- Powerplant: 1 × Ivchenko AI-25TL turbofan engine, 16.87 kN (3,790 lbf) thrust

Performance

- Maximum speed: 750 km/h (470 mph, 400 kn) at 5,000 m (16,000 ft)
- Never exceed speed: 980 km/h (610 mph, 530 kn) / M0.8
- Range: 1,100 km (680 mi, 590 nmi)(internal fuel)
- Ferry range: 1,750 km (1,090 mi, 940 nmi) (internal and external fuel)
- Endurance: two hours and 30 minutes (internal fuel), three hours and 50 minutes (internal and external fuel)
- Service ceiling: 11,000 m (36,000 ft)
- Rate of climb: 21 m/s (4,100 ft/min)
- Time to altitude: 5,000 m (16,000 ft) in 5 minutes
- Wing loading: 250 kg/m^{2} (51 lb/sq ft)
- Thrust/weight: 0.37
- Take-off roll: 530 m (1,740 ft)
- Landing roll: 650 m (2,130 ft)

Armament

- Up to 284 kg (626 lb) of stores on two external hardpoints

== See also ==
External videos
- In-cockpit footage of an L-39 taking off and performing aerobatics
- L-39 performing a solo display at the Wanaka 2012 airshow
- Excerpt from 1980s aerodynamics documentary

Related development

- Aero L-59 Super Albatros
- Aero L-159 ALCA
- Aero L-39 Skyfox

Aircraft of comparable role, configuration, and era

- Aermacchi MB-339
- AIDC AT-3
- BAE Systems Hawk
- CASA C-101
- Dassault/Dornier Alpha Jet
- FMA IA 63 Pampa
- IAR 99
- Kawasaki T-4
- PZL TS-11 Iskra
- PZL I-22 Iryda
- SIAI-Marchetti S.211
- Soko G-4 Super Galeb
