= EVTA =

EVTA may mean

- Endovenous thermal ablation
- European Voice Teachers Association, a member organisation of the European Music Council
- Tukums Airport, now Jūrmala Airport (EVJA)
