= Baltic Bees Jet Team =

Civilian aerobatic display team

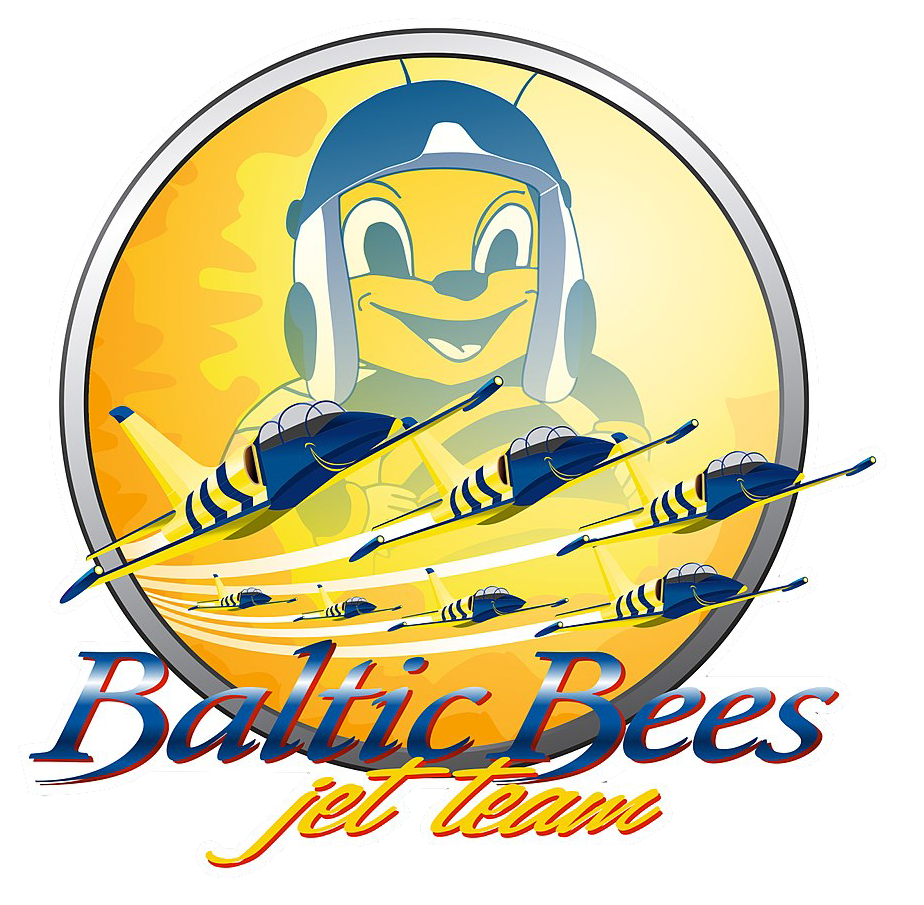
- Baltic Bees Jet Team emblem
- Active: 2008–present
- Type: Civilian aerobatic display team
- Garrison/HQ: Tukums, Latvia
- Website: balticbees.com

Aircraft flown
- Trainer: Aero L-39 Albatros

The Baltic Bees Jet Team is a civilian aerobatic display team based in Jūrmala Airport (EVJA), Latvia, 60km west of the capital, Riga. The team consists of six Czechoslovak Aero L-39 Albatros jets.

The team flies a display lasting around 20 minutes that includes formation flying, opposition passes, solo routines, and synchronized manoeuvres.

They fly in shows in Western Europe, Eastern Europe, Russia, as well as in China.

During the COVID-19 pandemic, during an air show in China, some of the aircraft were left stranded there. However, the aircraft left at Tukums, have been conducting pleasure flights in Italy, away from the team’s usual base in Latvia.

The last jets stranded in China were recovered over the winter, allowing the team to resume airshow activities later in 2024. The team will participate in the ANTIDOTUM airshow, Suwalki Air Show, Airshow Mielec and Radom Airshow, in June (2), July and in August 2025 respectively.
