= Jūrmala Airport =

Airport in Latvia

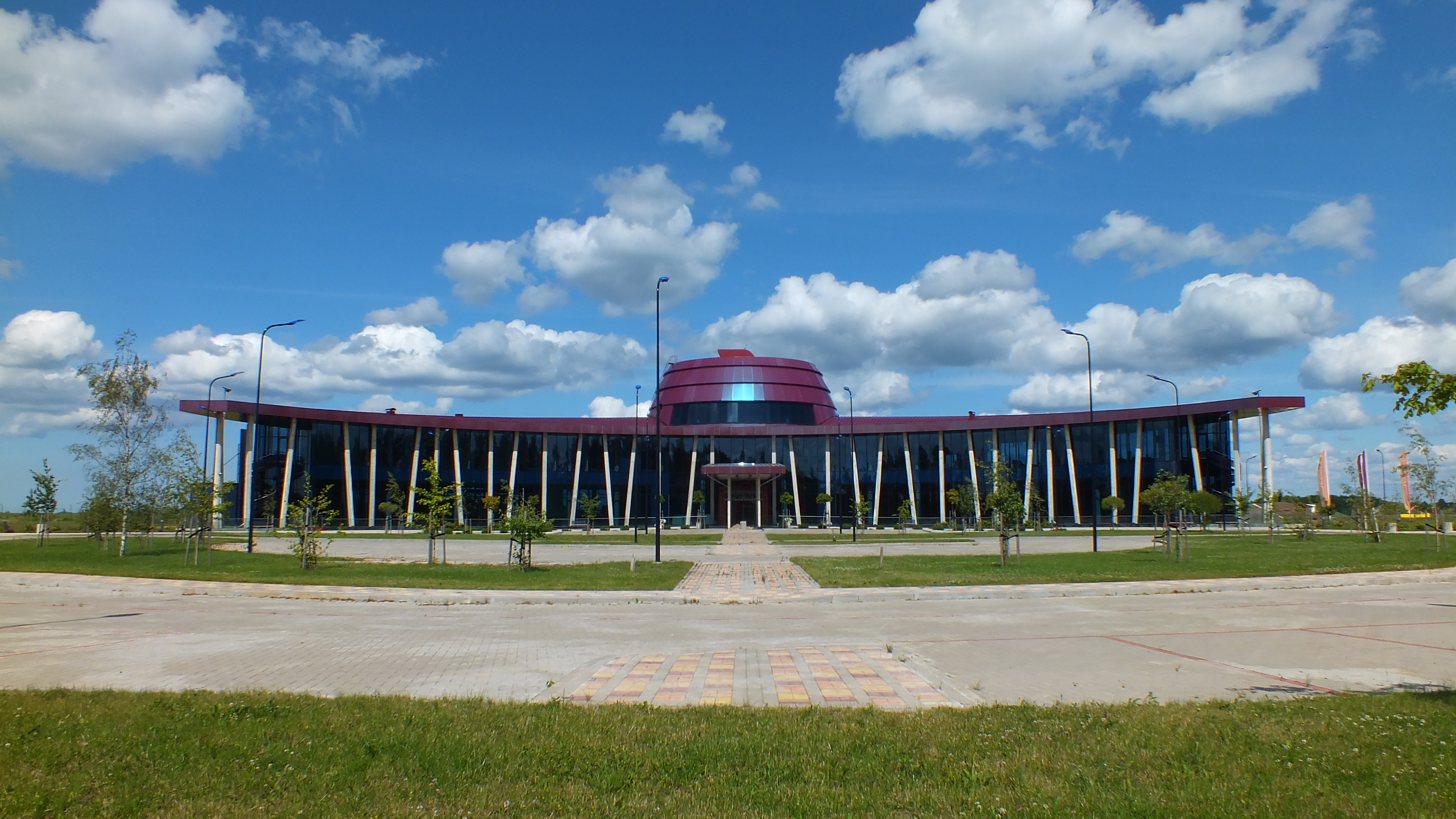
- IATA: QUJ; ICAO: EVJA

Summary
- Airport type: Public
- Elevation AMSL: 233 ft (71 m)
- Coordinates: 56°56′30″N 023°13′24″E
- Website: http://jurmalaairport.com//

Maps
- Location in Latvia
- Interactive map of Jūrmala Airport

Runways
Direction	Length		Surface
Direction	m	ft	Surface
13/31	2,500	8,202	Concrete

Jūrmala Airport (ICAO: EVJA) is an airport located 5 km (3 mi) in Smārde Parish, Tukums Municipality, in the Courland region of Latvia, southeast of Tukums.

All of the airport's technical infrastructure, runway and buildings are what was left of the former Soviet military Tukums air base, which was a spartan military airfield with a single long ramp and revetted area. The base was completely abandoned, but in 2010 the conversion of the base to a civil airport with passenger terminals started. This airport is the also the home of the Baltic Bees Jet Team

== History ==
The aviation history in the area starts in early 1930s, when the first hangar and workshop were constructed. The USSR placed aircraft in Latvian airfields and expanded, and built new airfields.

During World War II an airfield was built for German Luftwaffe.

After the war it was operated by the Soviet Navy, flying Su-24 (Fencer) aircraft operated by 668 MShAP (668 мшап, 668th Naval Shturmovik Aviation Regiment) . Another source gives 240 MShAP (240th Naval Shturmovik Aviation Regiment).

In the spring of 1993 the airfield was recognized as Reserve Airfield of Tukums (RAT) of the Latvian Air Forces. Since July 31, 2001 the Tukums airfield belonged to Smārde parish. On March 15, 2005, Tukums Airport Ltd. was established. In 2005–2006 renovation of the runway and in 2009–2010 construction of the passenger terminal has started. In 2011 ILS and VOR/DME installation and light-signal system certification has been completed.

== Accidents and incidents ==
- On 2008, prior to the Tukums Air Show, YL-CCX (cn 31-647) a Piper PA-31-310 Navajo, was flown on a Visual flight rules (VFR) flight from Riga-Spilve airport to the Tukums Air Show in deteriorating weather. The aircraft crashed near Tukums killing the pilot and injuring seven student pilots who were passengers on the aircraft.
