= Goragorsky =

Rural locality in Nadterechny District, Russia

Coordinates: 43°30′N 45°5′E

Goragorsky (Russian: Горагорский; Chechen: Горагорск) is a rural locality (a settlement) in Nadterechny District of the Chechen Republic, Russia, located on the Gorga. Population: 4,668 (2010 census).
