= Ķemeri =

Neighborhood of Jurmala, Latvia

Coordinates: 56°56′18″N 23°29′22″E

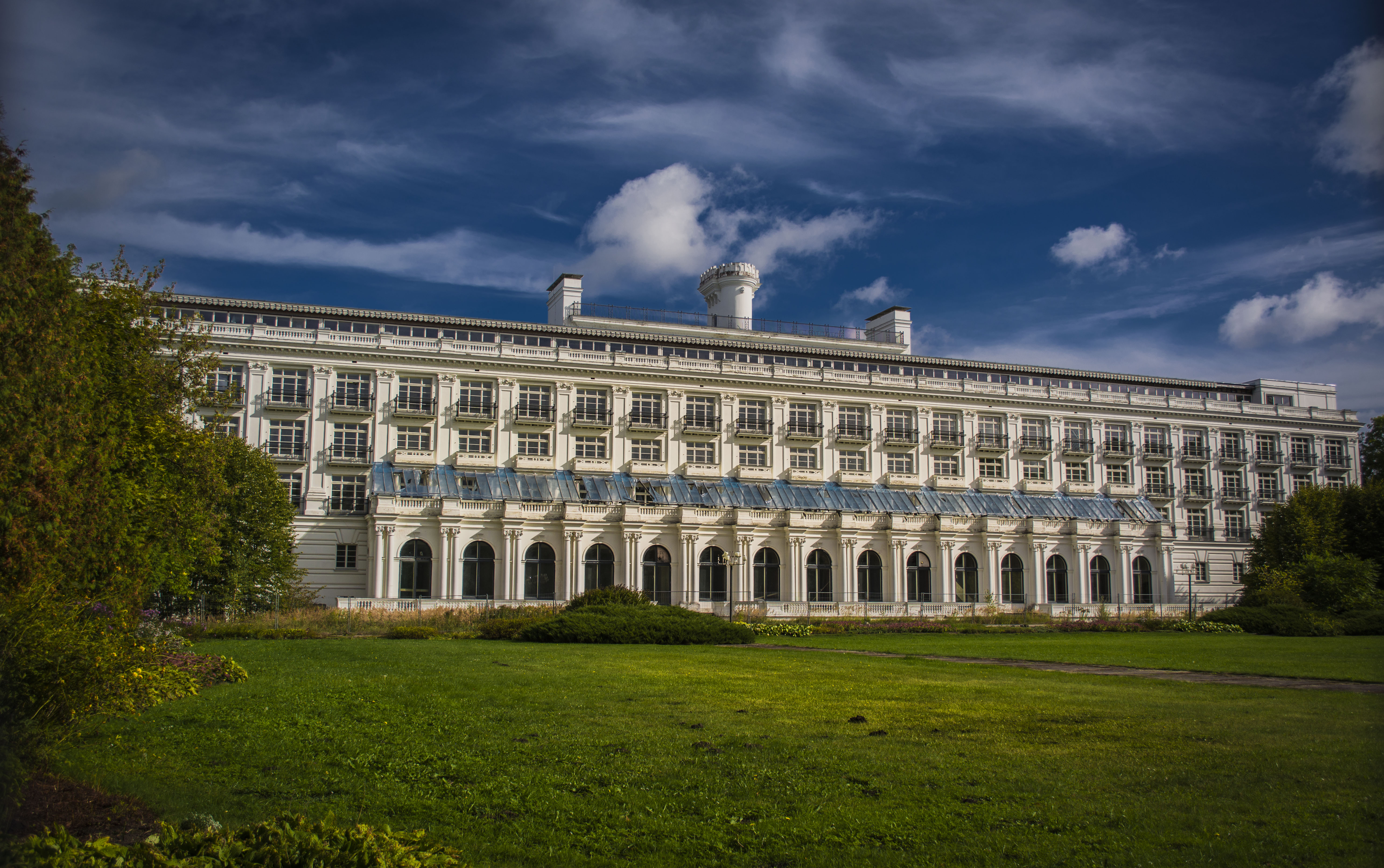
- Ķemeri sanatorium (hotel)

- Coat of arms

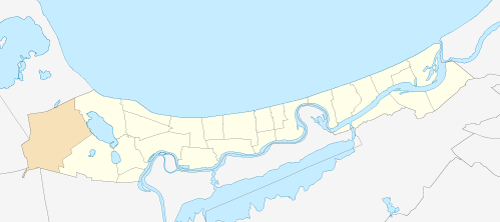
- Location in Jūrmala
- Country: Latvia
- City: Jūrmala
- Founded: 1838
- City rights: 1928
- Included in Jūrmalā: 1959

Area
  - Total: 13.8 km^{2} (5.3 sq mi)
- Elevation: 3 m (9.8 ft)

Population (2008)
  - Total: 1,962
  - Density: 142.2/km^{2} (368/sq mi)

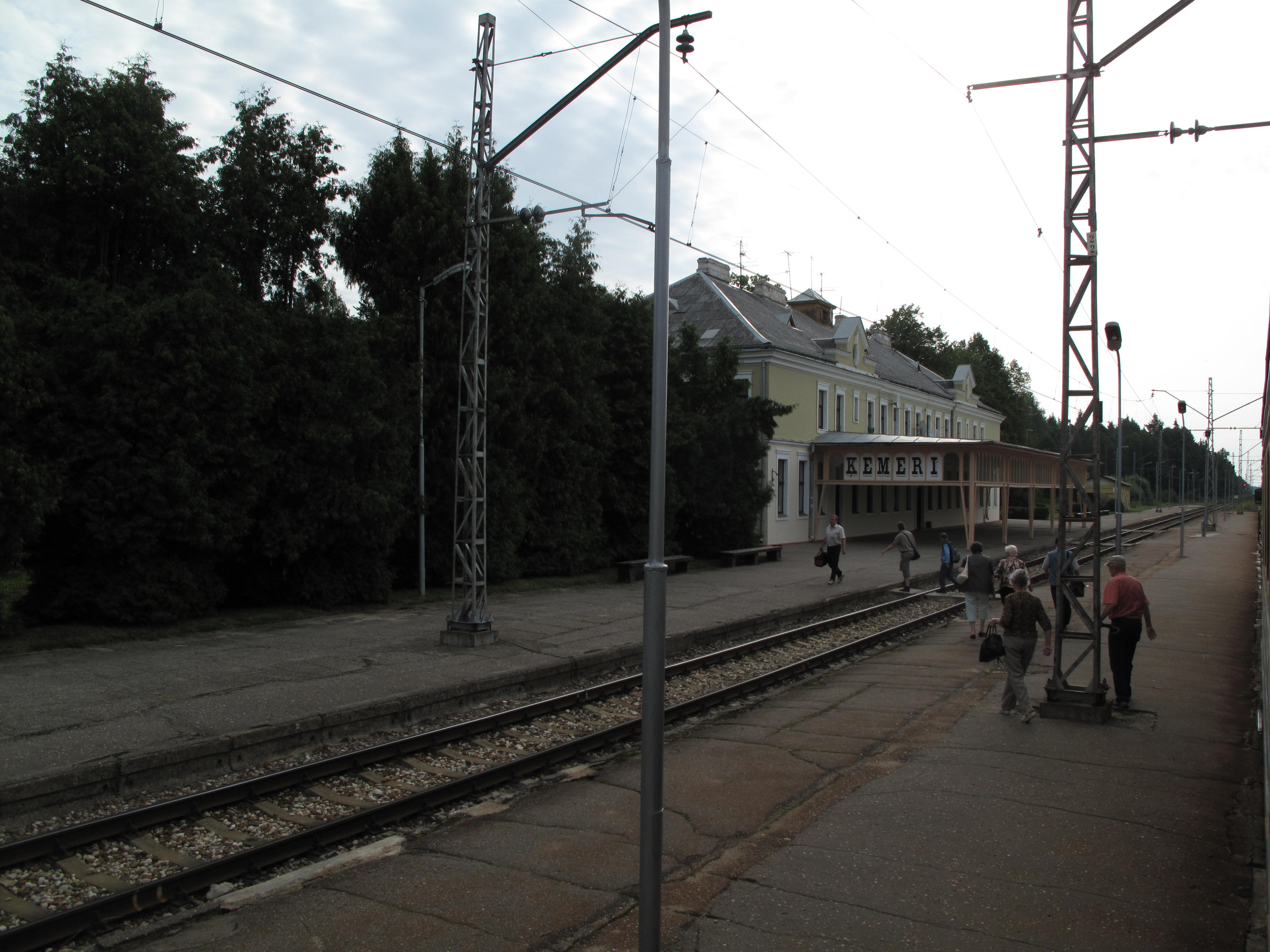
Ķemeri, train station

Ķemeri resort (originally Ķemeres, also known as Kemmern) is a part of Jūrmala in Latvia, 44 km from Riga. From 1928 to 1959, Ķemeri was a separate town, famous for healing mud baths and luxurious hotels. Approximately 2,200 inhabitants live there, while the main hotel is under reconstruction.

== History ==
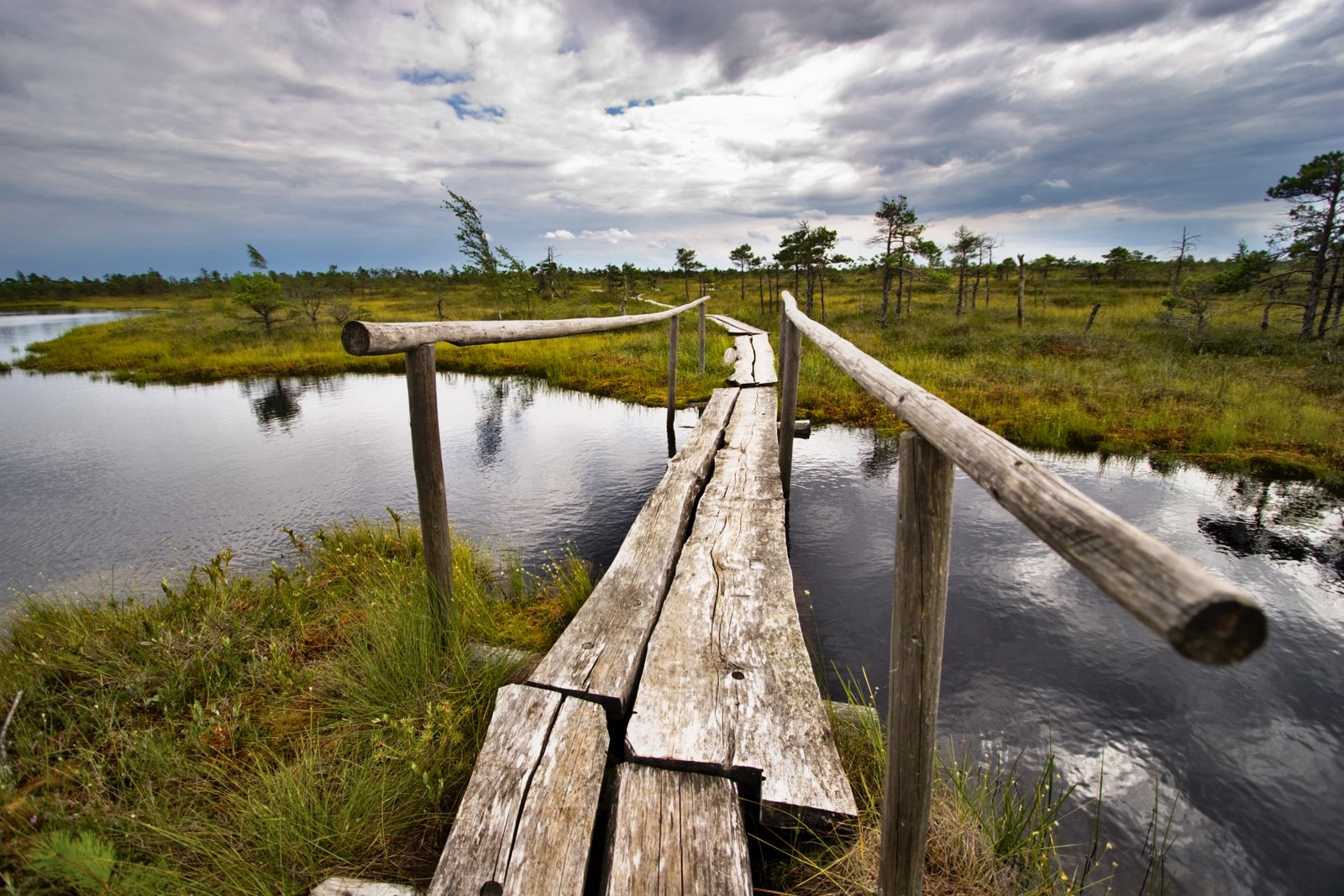
Big Kemeri swamp national park.

The name Ķemeri (Kemmern) first appears in written sources after the founding of the Dukedom of Courland in 1561. Documentary evidence indicates that the springs at Ķemeri first became known for their curative properties in 1796, the first chemical analysis of the spring water being performed in 1818. The residents of the nearby town of Sloka began to build houses for the patients. In 1825, the first public building was built for spa guests. Bad Kemmern was founded as a resort in 1838, when the emperor Nicholas I of Russia gave this land for building the first bath-house with mineral water. From then onwards people started to come here for treatment. The Ķemeri railway station was established in 1877.

The Ķemeri resort became popular in the Russian Empire. In 1912, a direct railway link was created between Ķemeri and Moscow. The connection with the beach of Jaunķemeri was provided by electrical tram. Nerve disease as well as diseases of joints, bones, and muscles were treated in the resort. Treatment with sulfuring water and mud baths was also carried out. The annual number of people visiting the resort reached 8,300. During World War I, the battles between German and Russian forces lasting several years were only a few miles from Ķemeri. The resort was devastated and the train station was destroyed.

The newly created Republic of Latvia tried to restore the previous glory of Ķemeri. In 1924, a special bathing facility was built for mud baths equipped with mechanical hot mud feed and the pumping of used mud back to the bog. In 1929, a 42-m-tall water tower with a sightseeing platform at the top was built near the bathing facility. Ķemeri Hotel, informally called "the White Ship," has more than 100 rooms designed and built together by famous Latvian architect Eižens Laube and Spa Hotel's chief doctor and its director Dr. Janis Libietis. The hotel was opened to guests in 1936. Dr. Janis Libietis managed the Kemeri complex from 1928 to 1944 as he later sought asylum in Sweden.

== Ķemeri National Park ==
In 1997, Ķemeri National Park was established.

Over the years, parts of the park and surrounding historic resort infrastructure deteriorated due to neglect and natural wear. Restoration efforts were later initiated to preserve and renovate the area's historic Soviet-era architecture and park facilities.

In April 2017, Livland Group began renovation and restoration work within the park area. Reconstruction of the main Ķemeru Kūrorta Parks began in October 2019 and continued until 2021, with the official reopening taking place in August 2021.

The project included restoration of the Water Tower, renovation of paths and bridges, construction of parking areas and bicycle paths, installation of benches, informational signs, lighting, security cameras, trash bins, public restrooms, landscaping, and art installations. Several damaged areas were fenced off to prevent further deterioration. The restoration also included the removal of "Love Locks" from bridges, renovation of Ķemeri Love Island, and restoration of the exterior and gardens of the Ķemeri Hotel. The project was carried out to improve infrastructure and support tourism in the area.

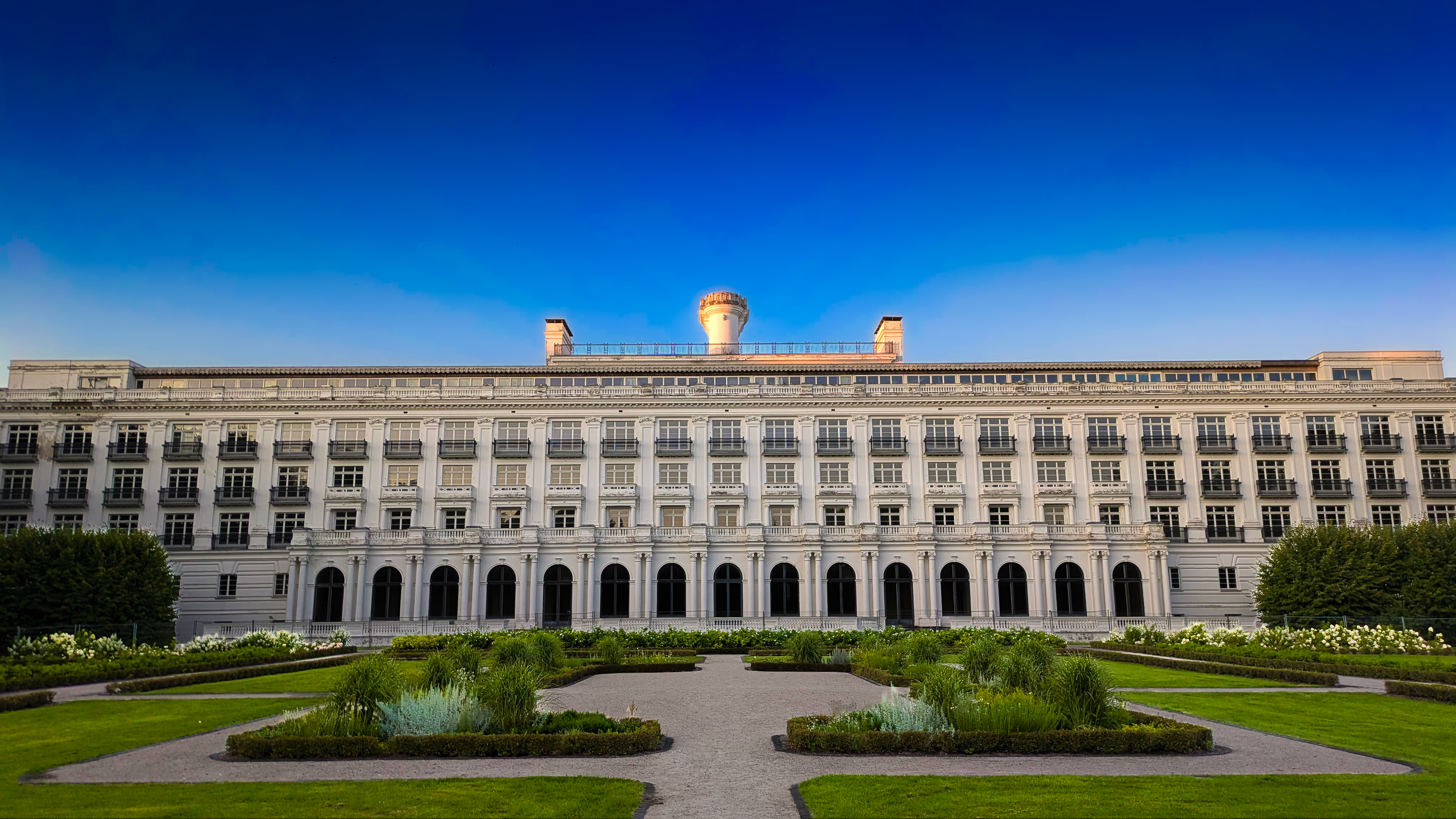
Ķemeri Hotel

The Ķemeri Hotel is currently not open to the public as a functioning hotel and can only be viewed from the surrounding garden area. However, there are other options available nearby, such as the hotel near the Ķemeri railway station.

In 1998, the sanatorium, after years of post -Sovietic abandonment, was purchased by Ominasis Italia and renovated according to a project by the architect Cesare Stefano Bernardinelli.

In 2014, the old abandoned hotel on Tūristu iela was demolished and the space is currently blank, with one last building to be demolished. The state hotel is being renovated for tourism again.
