= Ķemeri Hotel =

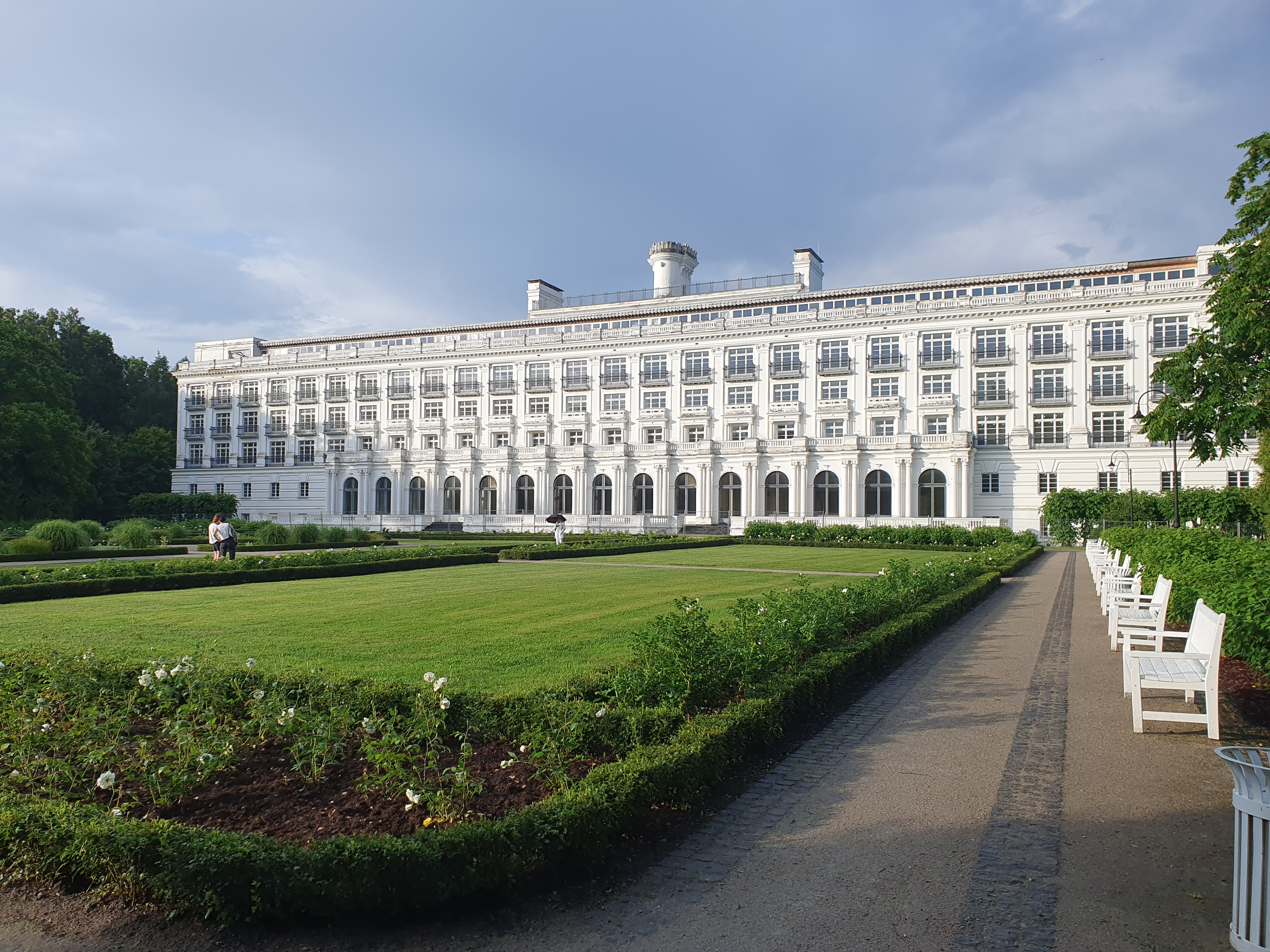
- Ķemeri Hotel in 2026

General information
- Architectural style: functionalism, neoclassicism, Art Deco
- Location: Tukuma iela 42, Jūrmala
- Coordinates: 56.9490°N 23.4993°E
- Opened: 1936
- Closed: After 1991

Technical details
- Size: more than 100 rooms
- Floor count: 5

Design and construction
- Architect: Eižens Laube

Ķemeri Hotel (Latvian: Ķemeru viesnīca), also known as the Ķemeri Sanatorium, is a former hotel and sanatorium in Ķemeri, Jūrmala, Latvia. Designed by architect Eižens Laube, the building was completed in 1936 and is regarded as one of the most prominent examples of Latvian architecture of the interwar period.

== History ==
The hotel was constructed as part of the development of Ķemeri as a major health resort. The building was designed by Eižens Laube, one of the leading Latvian architects of the period, and was completed in 1936 and officially opened by president Karlis Ulmanis.

The hotel was conceived on the model of leading European resort hotels. Despite being comparatively inexpensive, it was equipped according to the most advanced standards of the period. Its facilities were closely connected with the medical and spa functions of Ķemeri, which was known for its mineral water and therapeutic mud treatments.

By the late 1930s, the Ķemeri resort attracted large numbers of visitors. During the summer season, approximately 2,000–3,000 people could be present at the hotel and resort complex at the same time. Around 2,000 baths were administered daily, including mud, carbon-dioxide, sulphur and oxygen baths. Carbon-dioxide baths were reported to be particularly popular.

=== Sanatorium during Soviet occupation ===
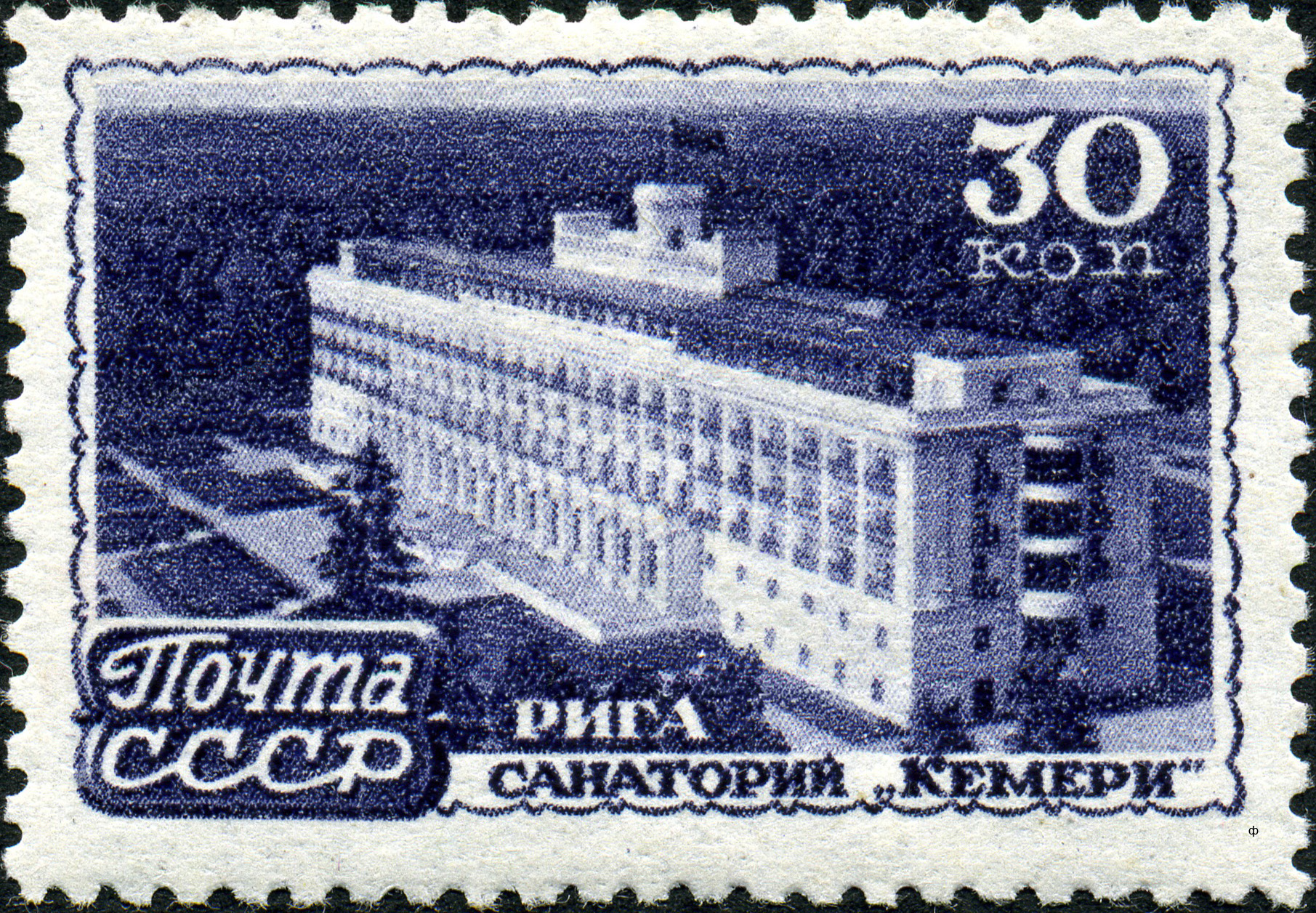
Soviet post stamp with the Ķemeri sanatorium

During the second half of the 20th century, the building ceased to function primarily as a hotel and became part of the Soviet state-run Ķemeri health resort complex. The complex included both accommodation and medical facilities and became one of the principal sanatoriums of the Ķemeri balneological resort.

Medical treatment at the sanatorium made use of contemporary therapeutic techniques and equipment. Patients were treated primarily for diseases of the musculoskeletal and nervous systems as well as gynaecological disorders.

The building was subsequently adapted to accommodate approximately 300 patients.

=== After restoration of independence ===
Following the restoration of Latvian independence, the former hotel was closed and plans were made for its reconstruction and conversion back into a hotel. For many years, however, reconstruction did not progress because of changes of ownership and other difficulties.

Active restoration work on the building began in 2016 but the works were eventually jeopartised by the COVID-19 pandemic and the 2022 Russian invasion of Ukraine.

The hotel was also used as a film shooting location.

== Architecture ==
The five-storey building combines elements of functionalism with neoclassicism and Art Deco. The building is characterised by a monumental composition and extensive use of classical architectural elements, including columns, pilasters, balustrades and cornices.

The hotel originally contained more than 100 rooms. Its interiors included a large entrance hall, a rose room and a library. Parts of the original interior decoration, furnishings and works of art have survived, with the library among the best-preserved interiors.

== Gallery ==
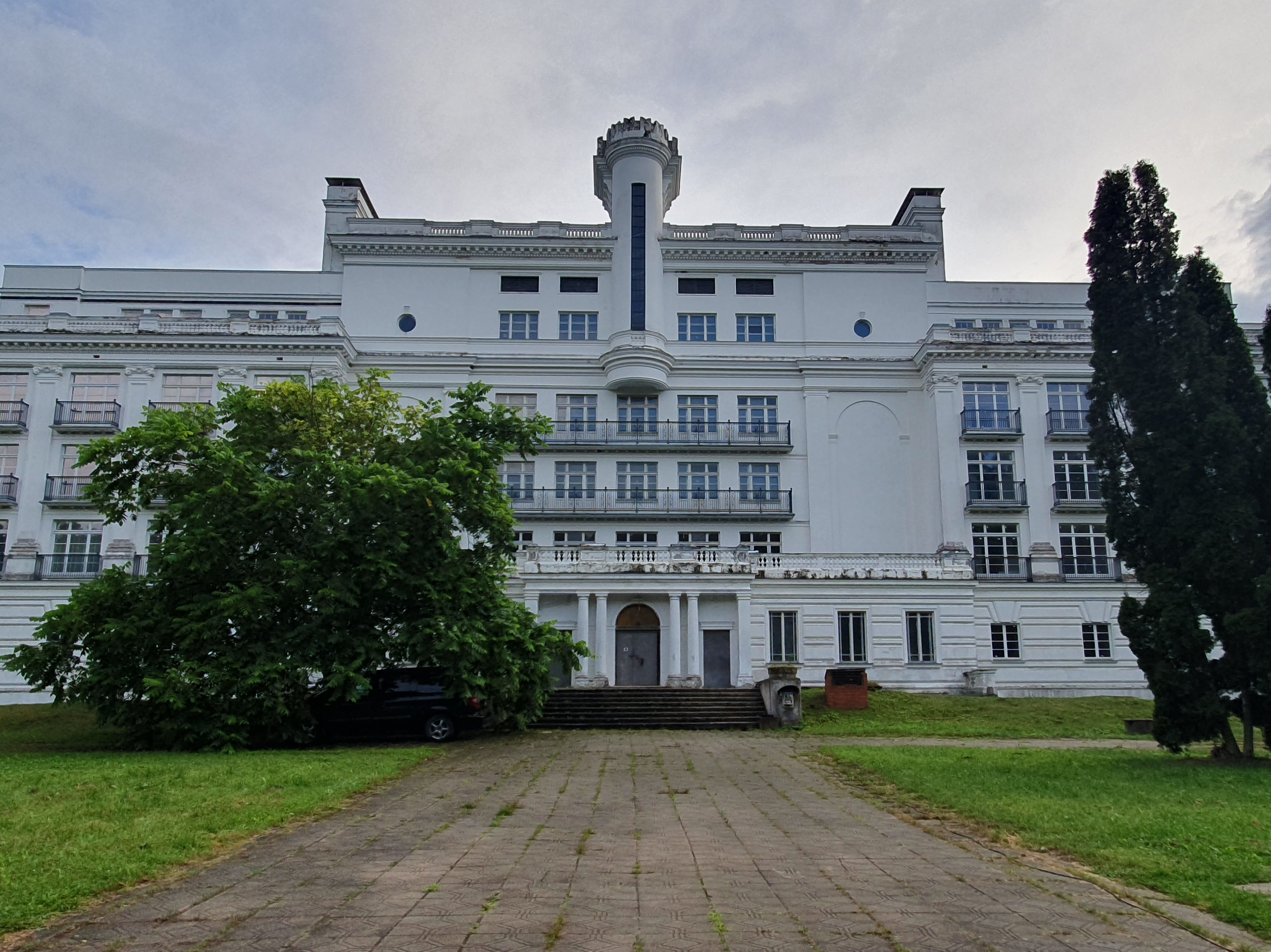
Hotel entrance in 2026

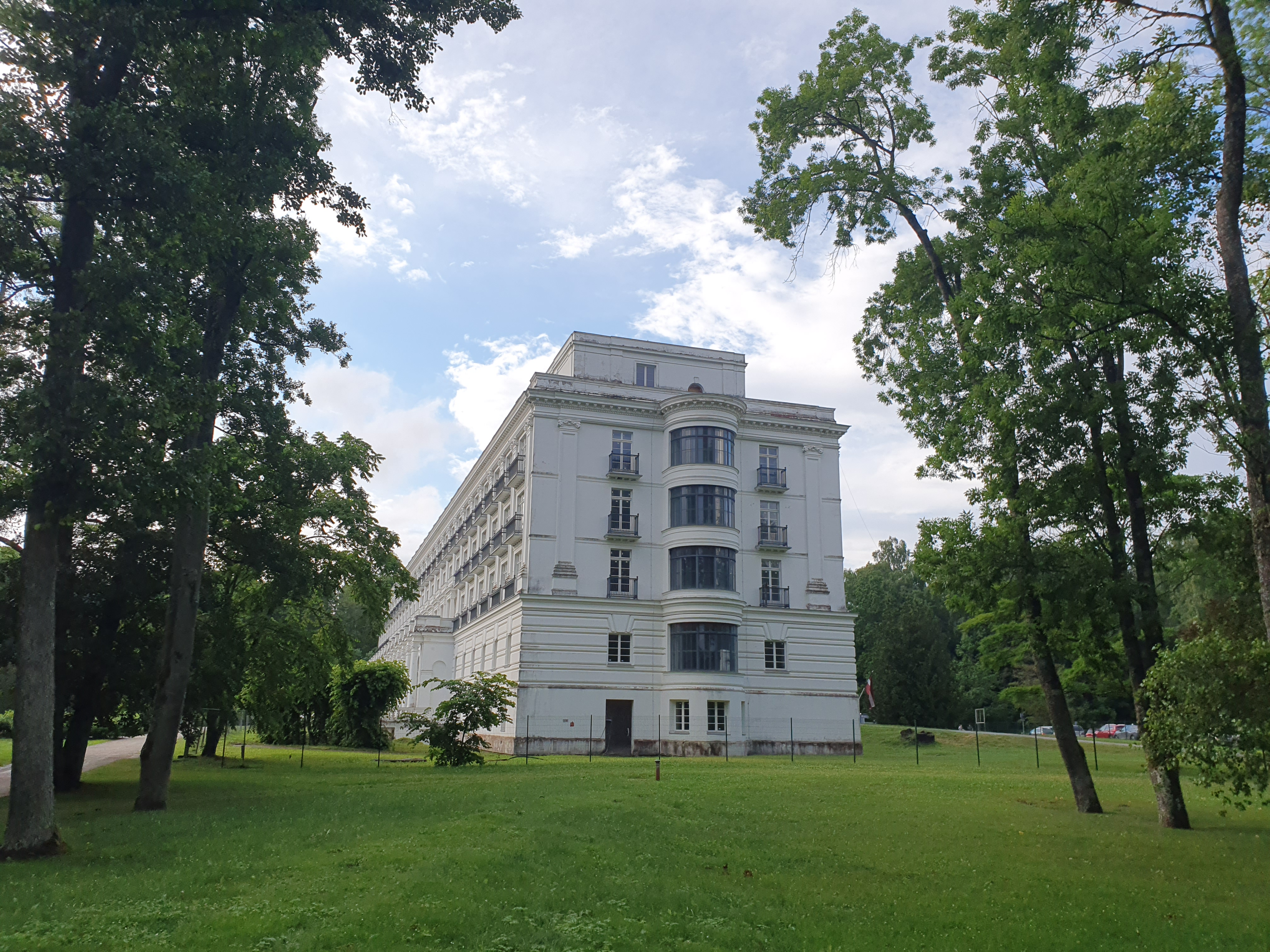
Side view

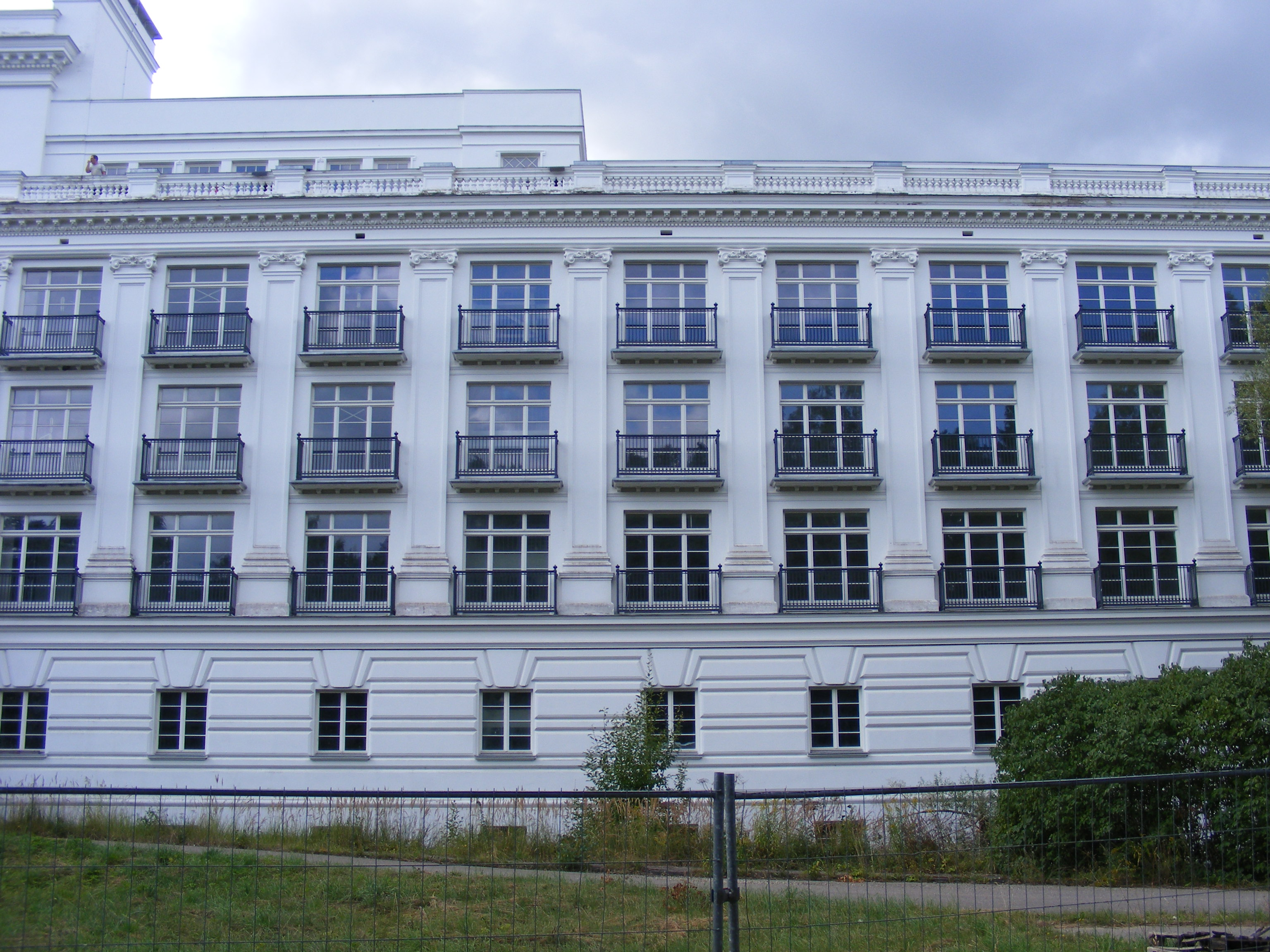

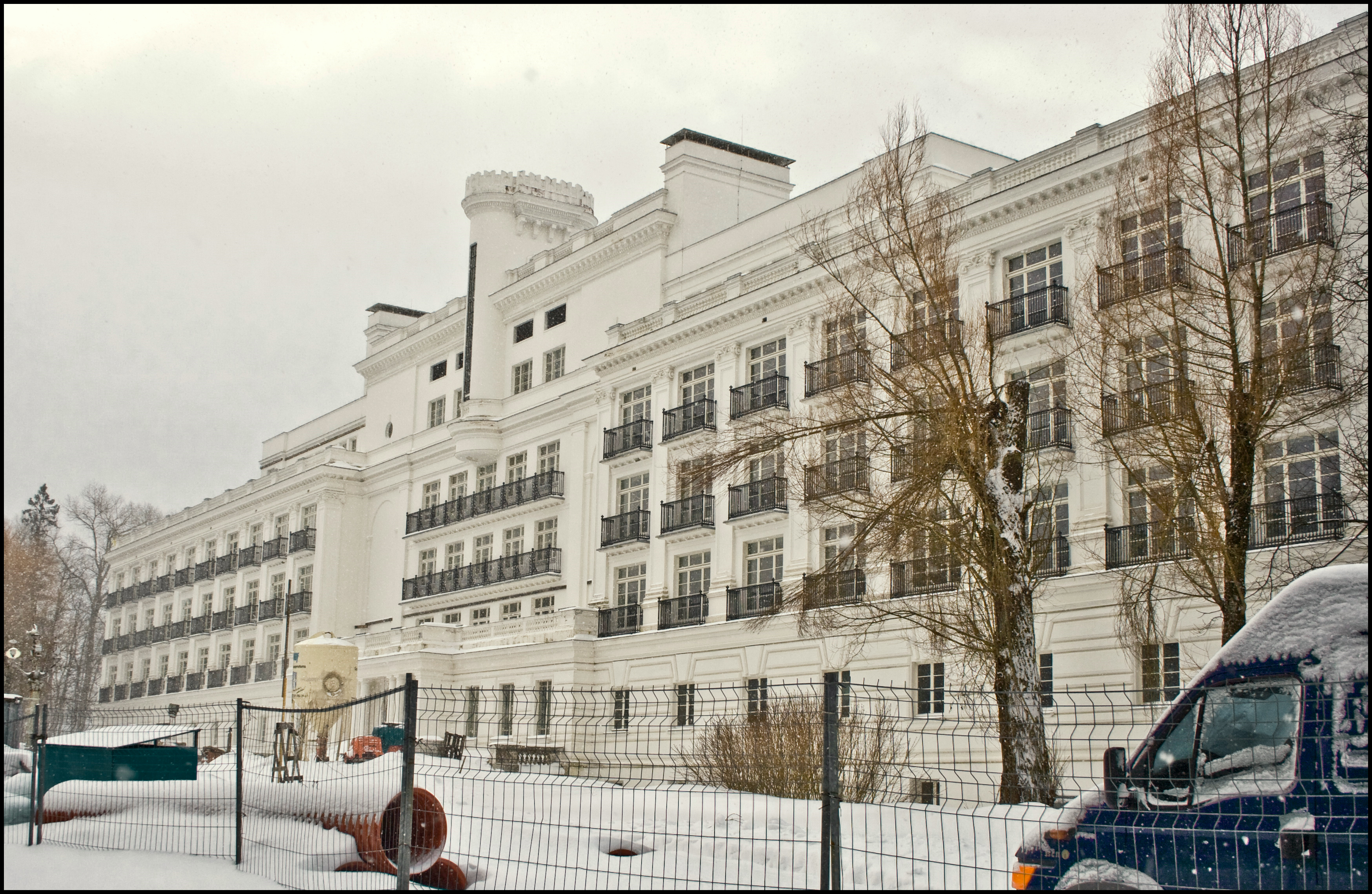
The hotel in the winter of 2011
