= Eižens Laube =

Latvian architect

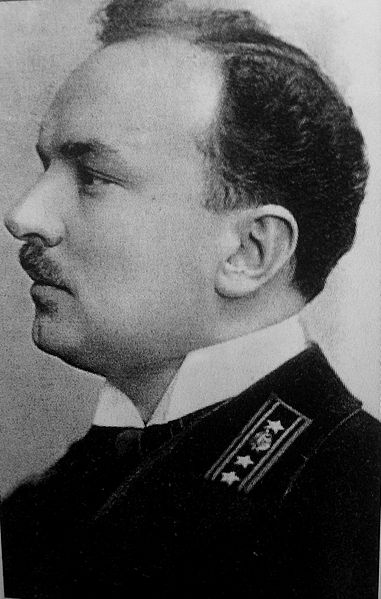
- Eižens Laube around 1913.
- Born: May 25, 1880; Riga, Russian Empire
- Died: July 21, 1967; Portland, Oregon, U.S.
- Known for: Architecture
- Movement: Art Nouveau
- Awards: Order of Three Stars; Cross of Recognition

Eižens Laube (May 25, 1880 – July 21, 1967) was a Latvian architect. He was responsible for some of the reconstruction work of Riga Castle in the 1930s and designed more than 200 houses in Riga.

== Biography ==
Eižens Laube was born in Riga as a son of a potter. In 1899 he graduated Realschule and started architecture studies in Riga Polytechnic Institute. While still a student he started to work in Konstantīns Pēkšēns's architecture office in 1900. In 1904 he took a study trip to Finland where he was introduced to National Romanticism in architecture. Laube graduated from the Riga Polytechnic Institute's department of architecture in 1907. Soon after he established his own architectural office in Riga. He also became lecturer in Riga Polytechnic Institute. In 1909 he traveled to Sweden and Germany to improve his professional abilities. In 1910 he took a trip to France for the same purpose. From 1909 to 1914 he was the official adviser to the Commission for Artistic Issues in Architecture, in Riga.

After the First World War started in 1915 Laube together with Riga Polytechnic Institute was evacuated to Moscow. He returned to Riga in 1917. In 1919 he became one of the founding members of University of Latvia and became dean of Faculty of Architecture. He was elected professor in 1920. In 1922 he briefly became rector of the university. He was also chairman of the Latvian Architects Society (1924–26). In the 1930s he again became dean of Faculty of Architecture. In 1938 he participated in establishment of first Latvian professional architectural magazine Latvijas Architektūra.

After the Soviet occupation of Latvia in 1940, he was dismissed from all posts but was not physically repressed. After the Occupation of Latvia by Nazi Germany Laube resumed his work in the university in the autumn 1941. In 1944, he fled to Germany where he worked as a professor of architecture at the Baltic University, Pinneberg, near Hamburg. From 1950, he lived in Olympia, Washington in the United States where he worked in an architecture office. Since 1955 he lived in Portland. He devoted his last years to writing and died on July 21, 1967, in Portland.

== Architecture ==
Before World War I Laube was one of the pioneers of Riga Art Nouveau movement, notably the lavishly decorated apartment building at 23 Tallinas Street 1901 together with Pēkšēns. His best-known works are in the National Romantic version of the style. He mainly used natural materials, different-colored bricks, local varieties of stone, metal, wood. Laube's building ornaments were typically flower and geometric motifs, and his buildings were usually directed upwards in a vertical shape. Later his works especially in the 1930s were influenced by more neo-classical influences.

Building in National Romantic style (1908). Brivibas str. 62, Riga.

Building in the functionalism style (1929). Brivibas str. 39, Riga.

Building in Gertrudes str. 32, Riga. (1909)

Building in the Brivibas str. 47, Riga. (1908)

Building in the Kr. Barona str. 49, Riga. (1911)

Laube family house in Baložu str. 20, Riga. (1924)

Building in the Brivības str. 33 (1912)

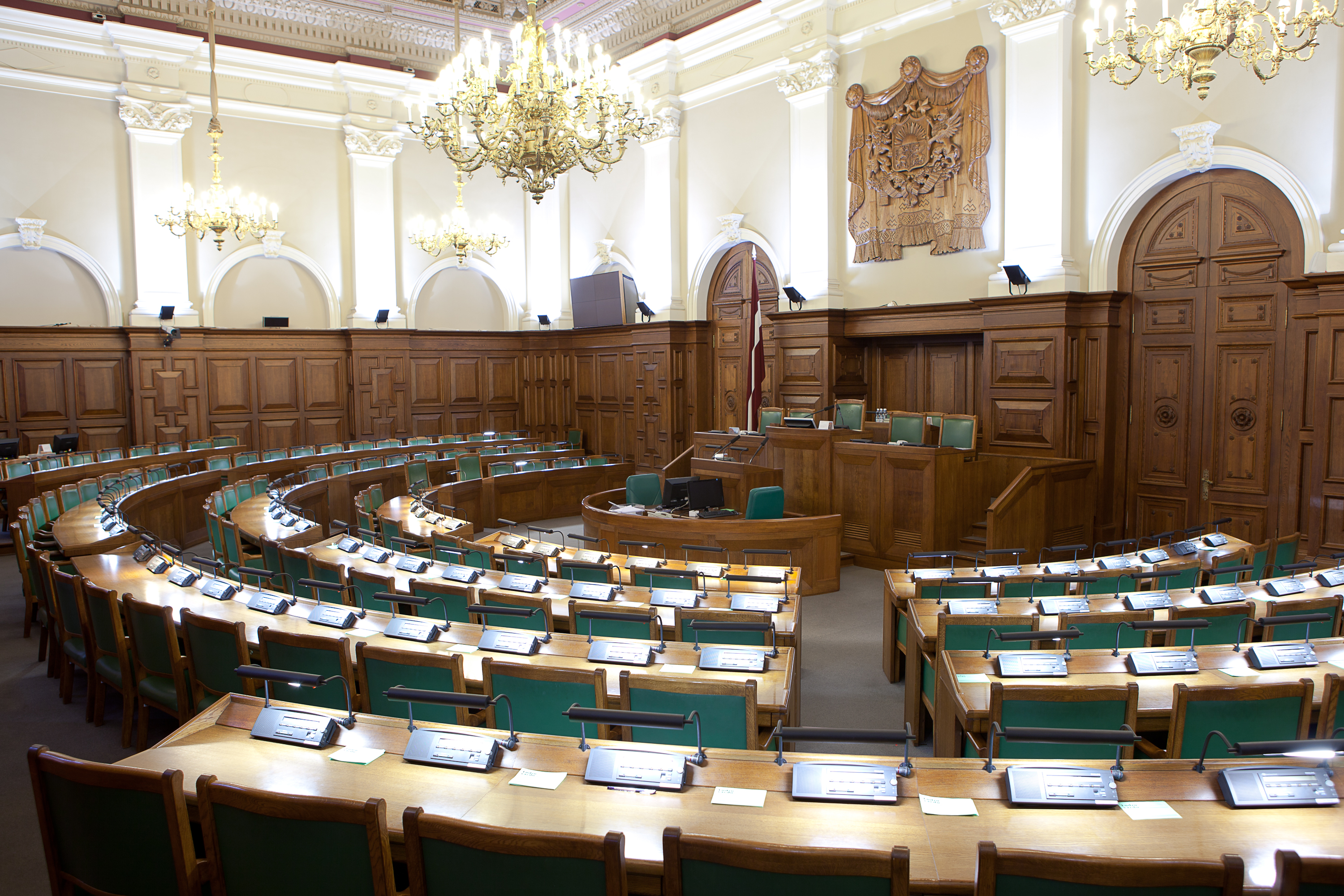
Planery Chamber in the House of the Livonian Noble Corporation, Jēkaba str. 11, Riga. (1922)

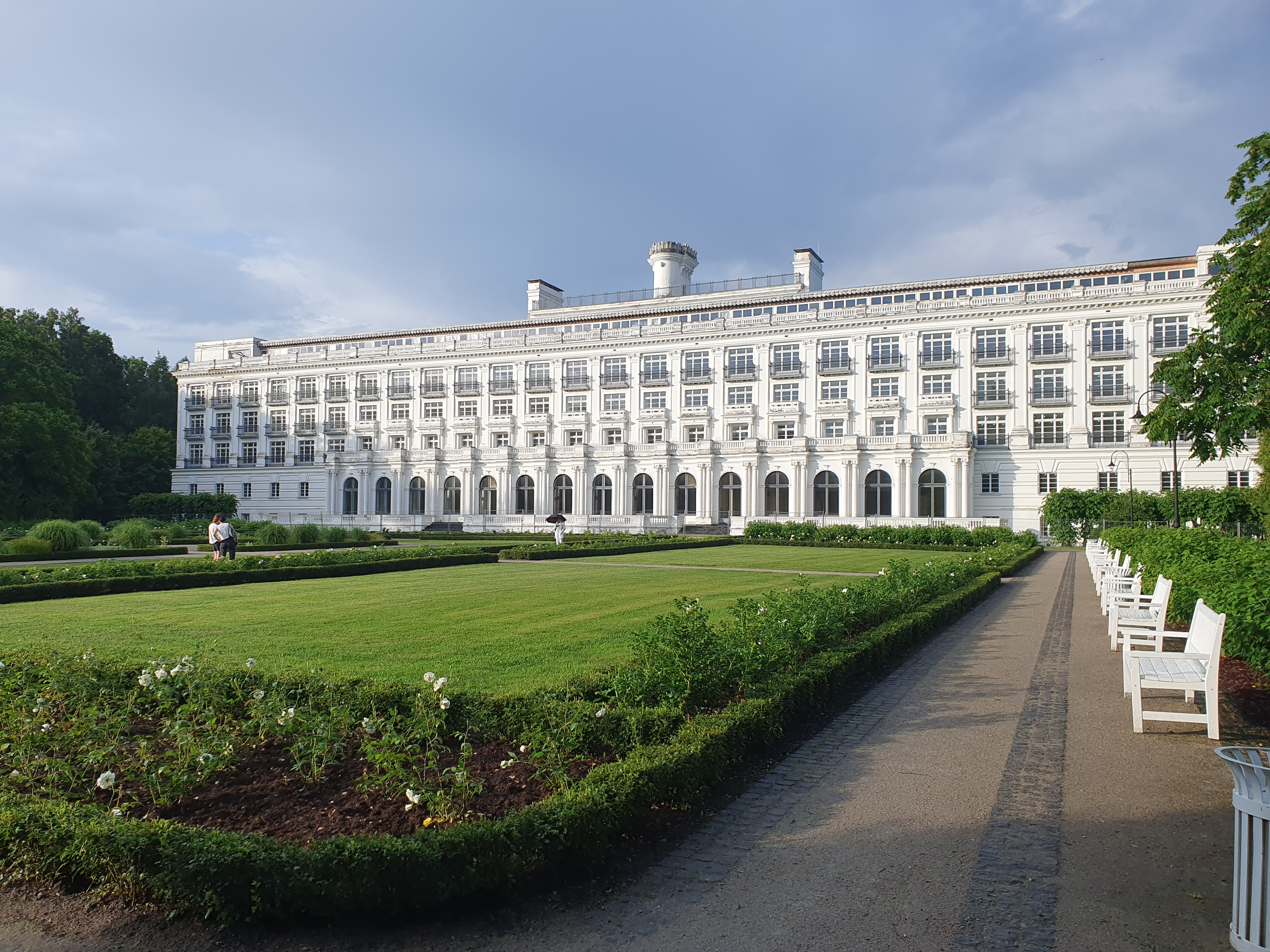
Ķemeri Hotel (1936)

Three Stars Tower on the Riga Castle, Pils laukums, Riga. (1939)

== See also ==
- Art Nouveau architecture in Riga
