= Jaunķemeri =

Neighbourhood of Jurmala, Latvia

Coordinates: 56°58′N 23°33′E

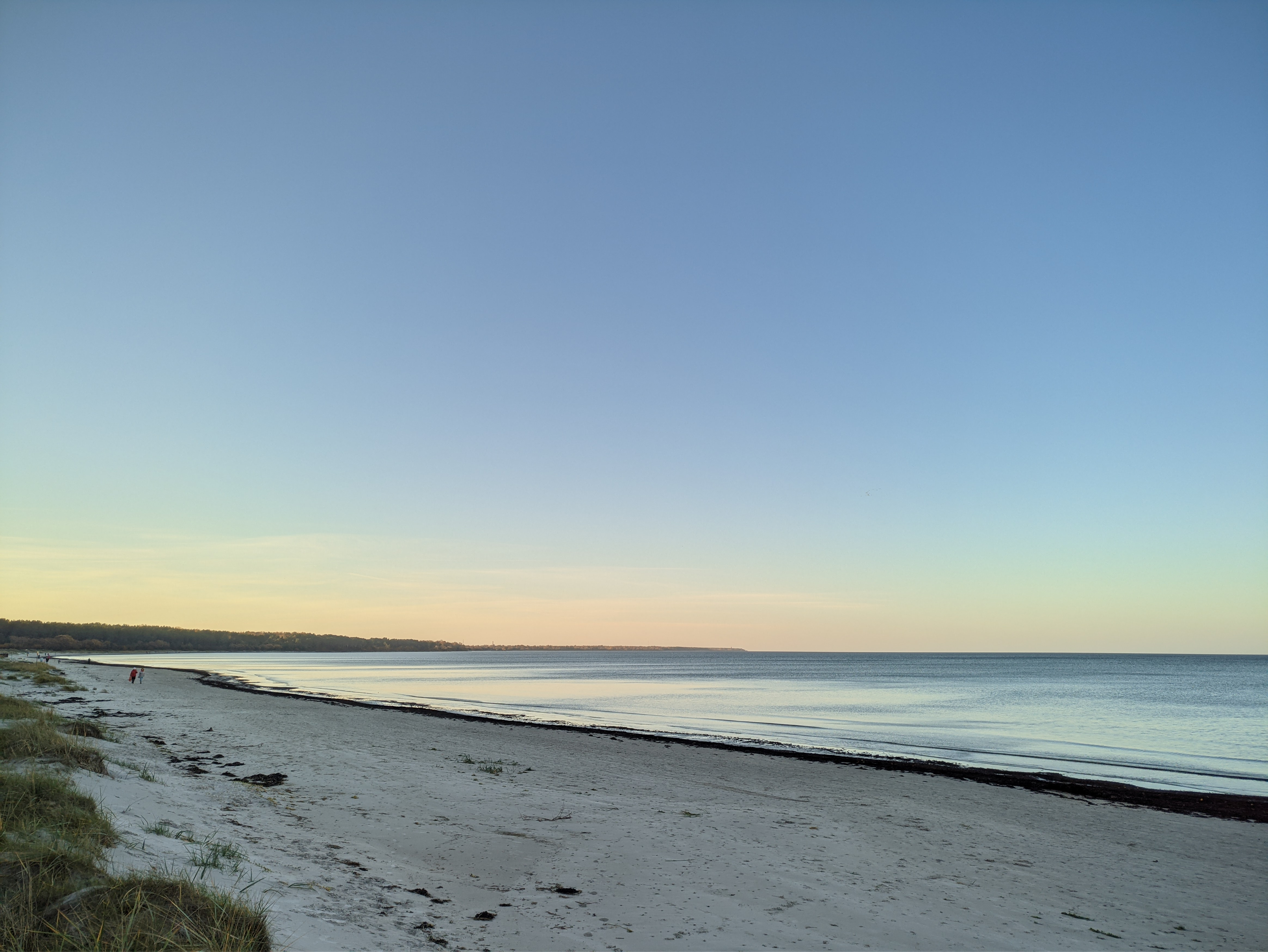
- Jaunķemeri beach

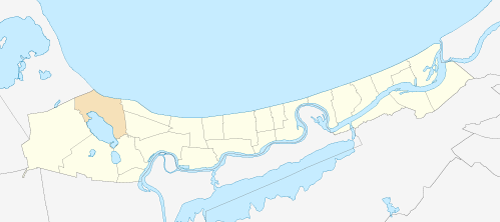
- Location in Jūrmala
- Country: Latvia
- City: Jūrmala

Area
  - Total: 8.3 km^{2} (3.2 sq mi)
- Elevation: 3 m (9.8 ft)

Population (2008)
  - Total: 188
  - Density: 22.7/km^{2} (59/sq mi)
- Postal code: LV-2012

Jaunķemeri is a residential area and neighbourhood of the city Jūrmala, Latvia. It is located on the shore of the Gulf of Riga between Kaugurciems and Bigauņciems and inside the territory of Ķemeri National Park.
