= Medemciems Station =

Railway station in Latvia

Medemciems
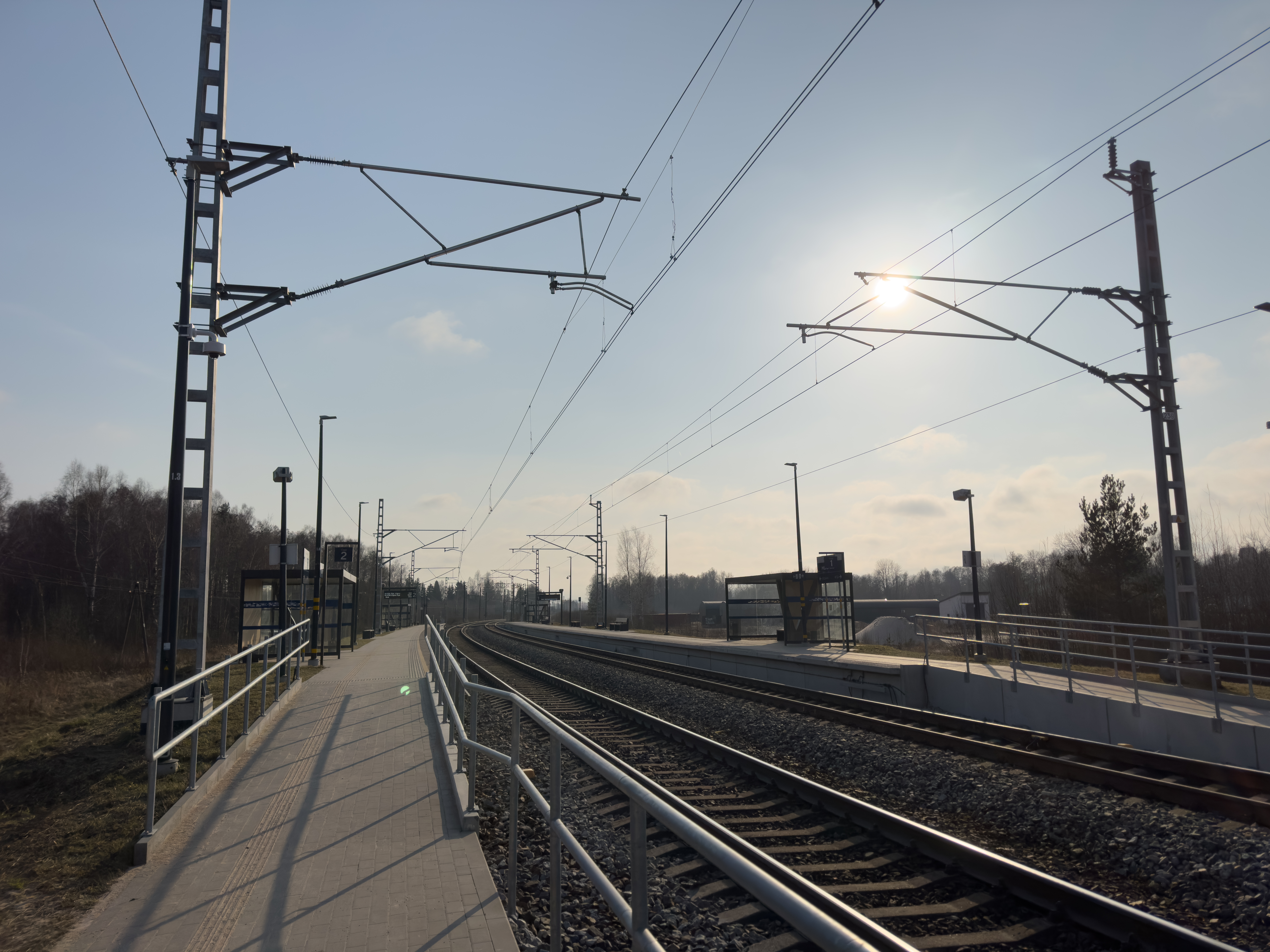

General information
- Location: Olaine Parish, Olaine Municipality; Latvia
- Coordinates: 56.855778°N 24.058972°E
- Owner: Latvijas dzelzceļš (LDz)
- Platforms: 2
- Tracks: 2
- Train operators: Vivi

History
- Opened: 15 December 2024; 21 months ago

Services
Preceding station	LDz	Following station
Jaunolaine towards Jelgava	Riga–Jelgava	Tiraine towards Riga
Location

Medemciems Station is a commuter railway station serving the villages of Stūnīši and Medemciems in Olaine Parish in Olaine Municipality south of Riga, Latvia. The station is situated between the two villages, near the A8 National Road.

The station is located on the Riga–Jelgava line. It was opened on 15 December 2024, and at the same time the Baloži Station, which was located 1.4 km to the south of the station, was closed. Electric trains running on the line stop at the station (diesel trains do not stop).

== Services ==
Operator	Route	Status
(Latvia) Pasažieru vilciens ("Vivi")	Rīga — Jelgava	In service
(Latvia) Pasažieru vilciens ("Vivi")	Jelgava — Rīga	In service

== Gallery images ==
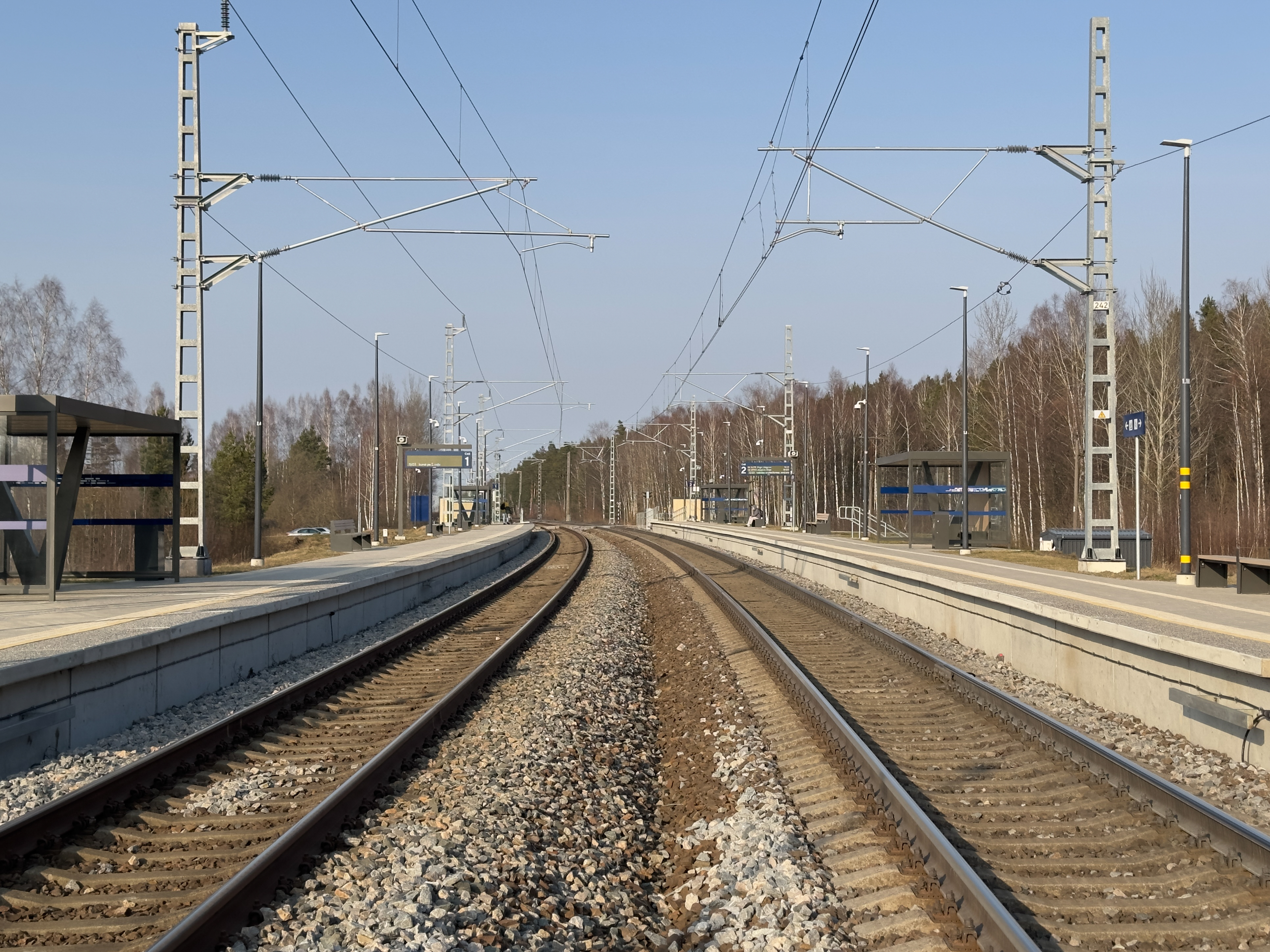
View in the direction of Riga

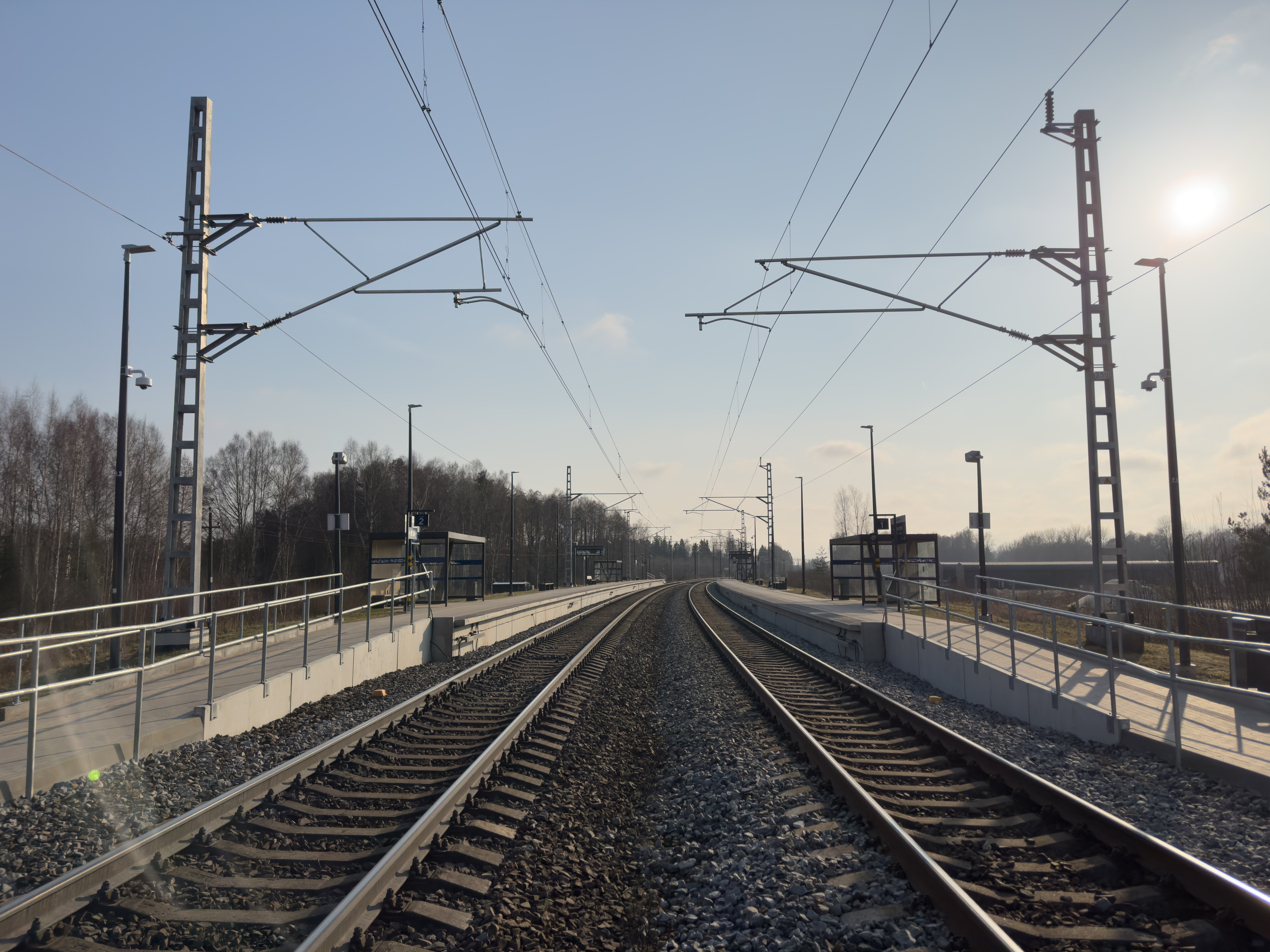
View in the direction of Jelgava

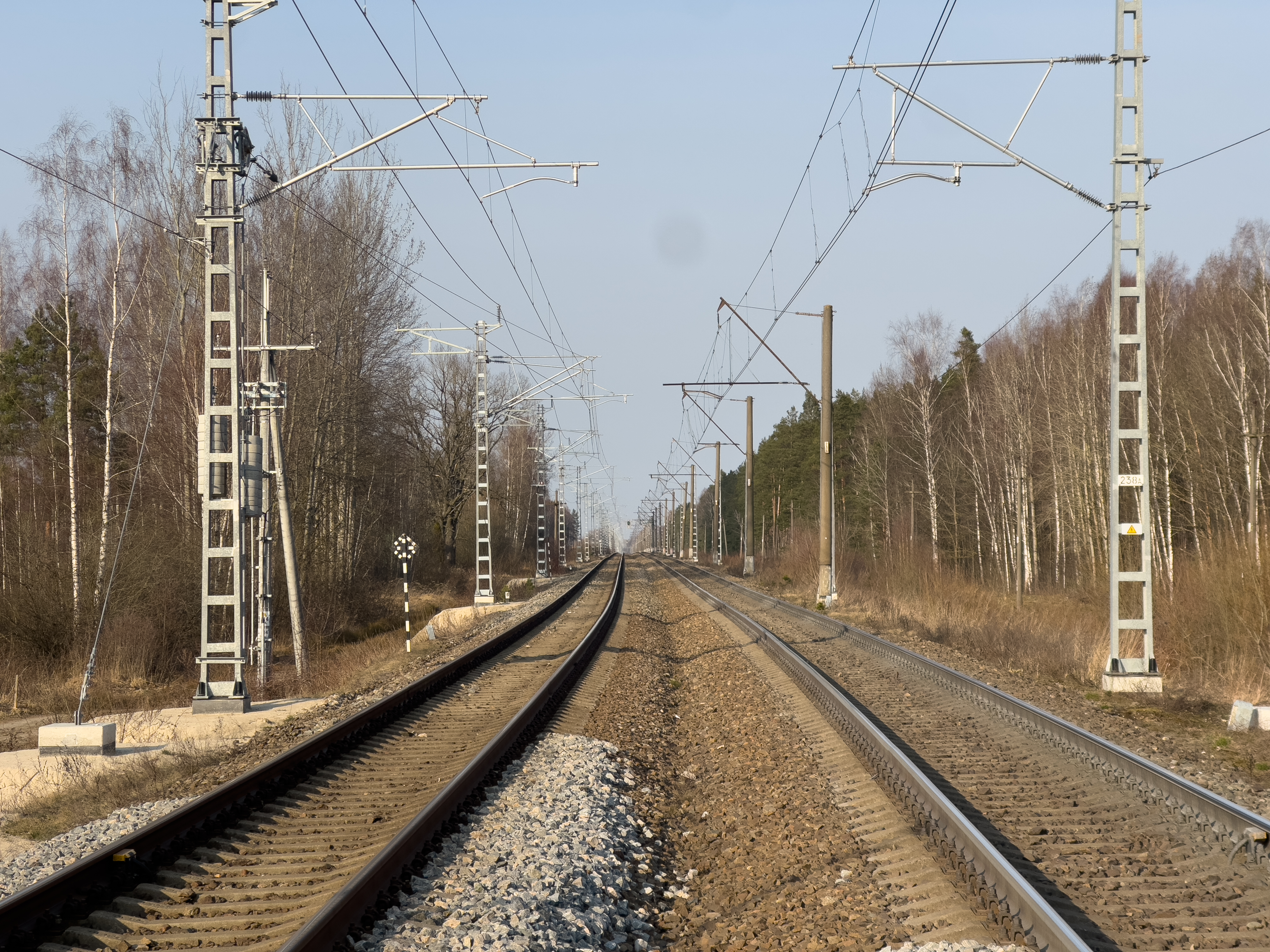
Tracks in the direction of Riga

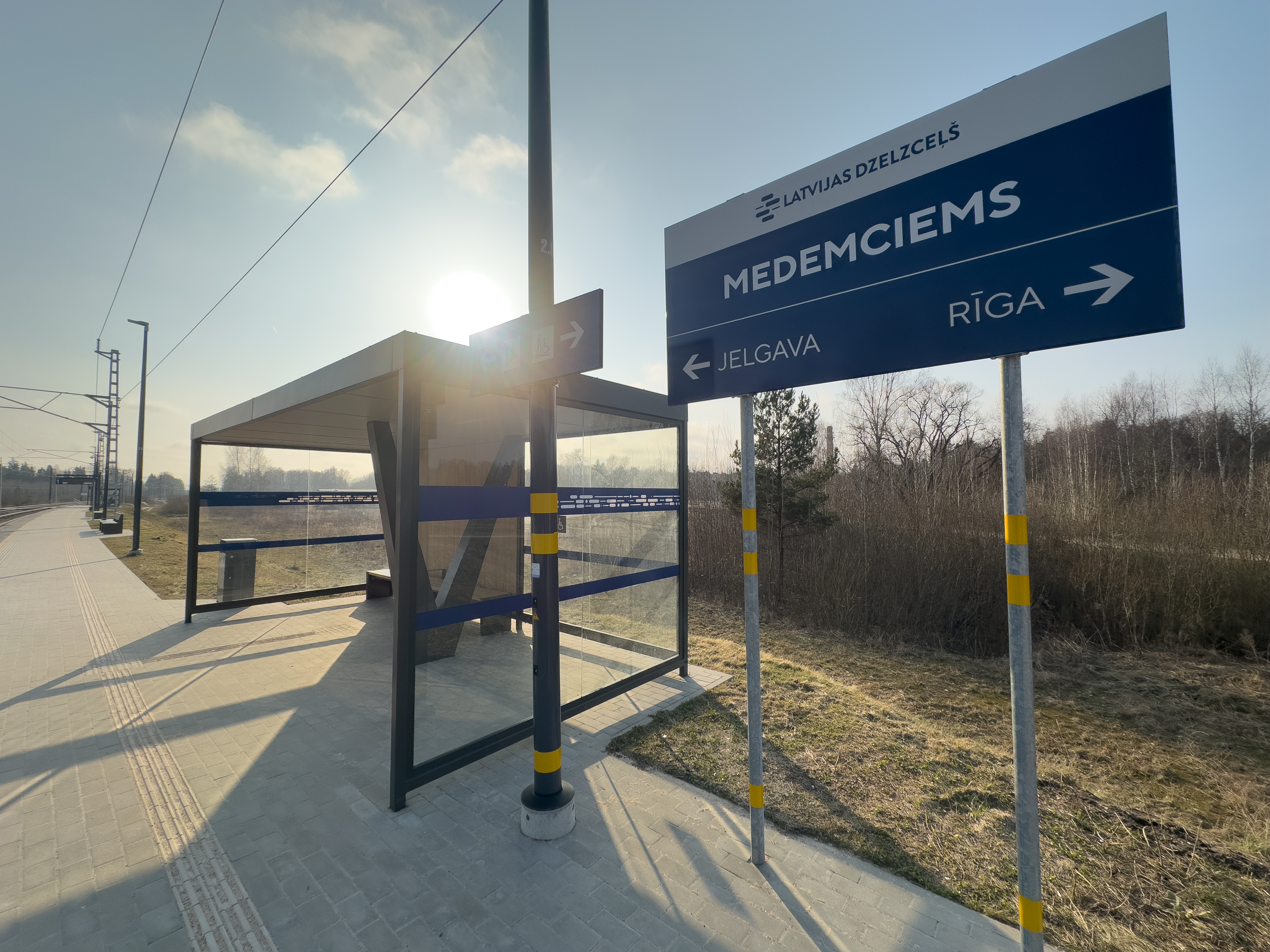
Shelter and station signage

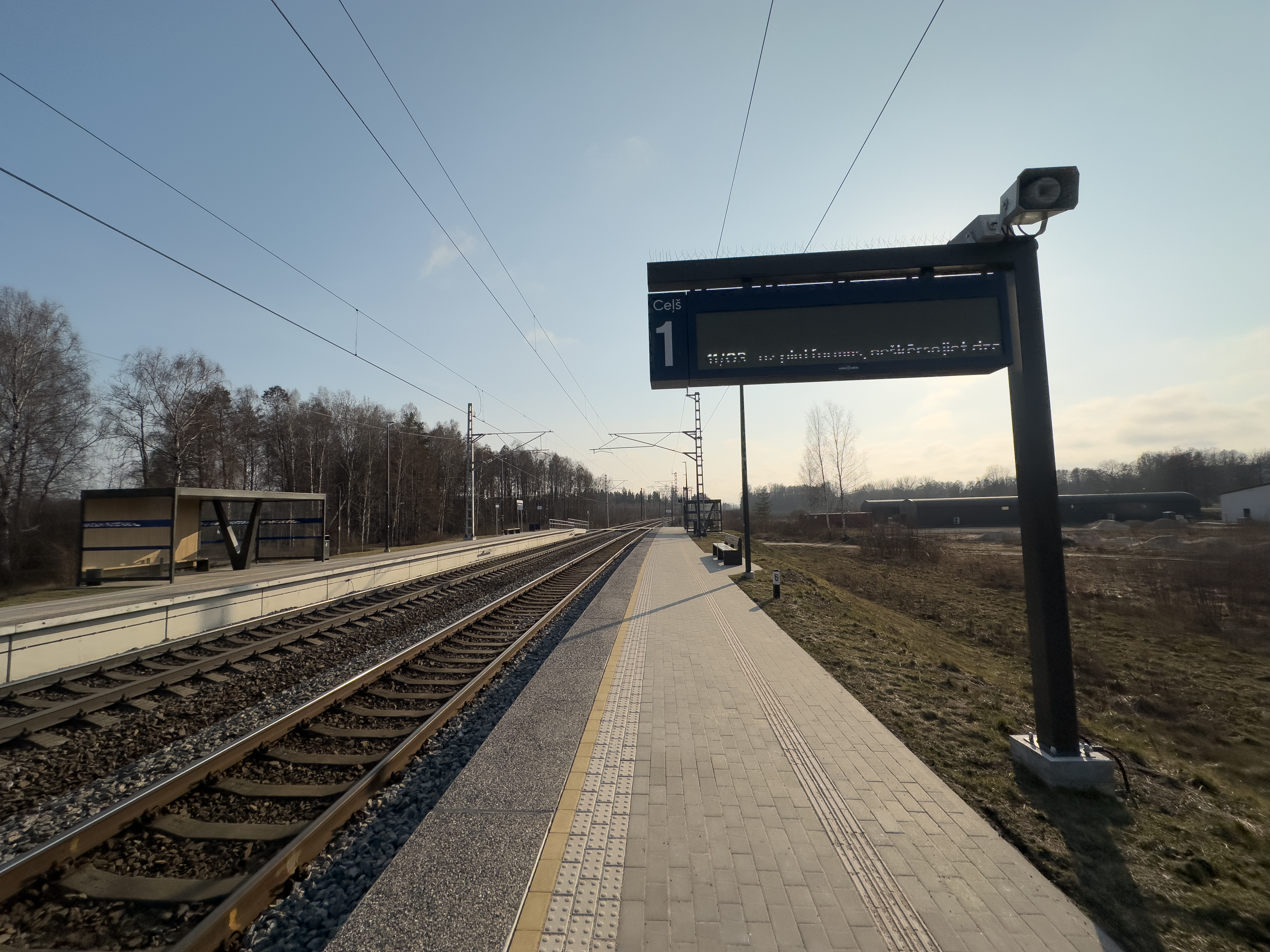
Information display

== See also ==
- Transport in Latvia
- Rail transport in Latvia
- History of rail transport in Latvia
