= Baloži Station =

Railway station in Latvia

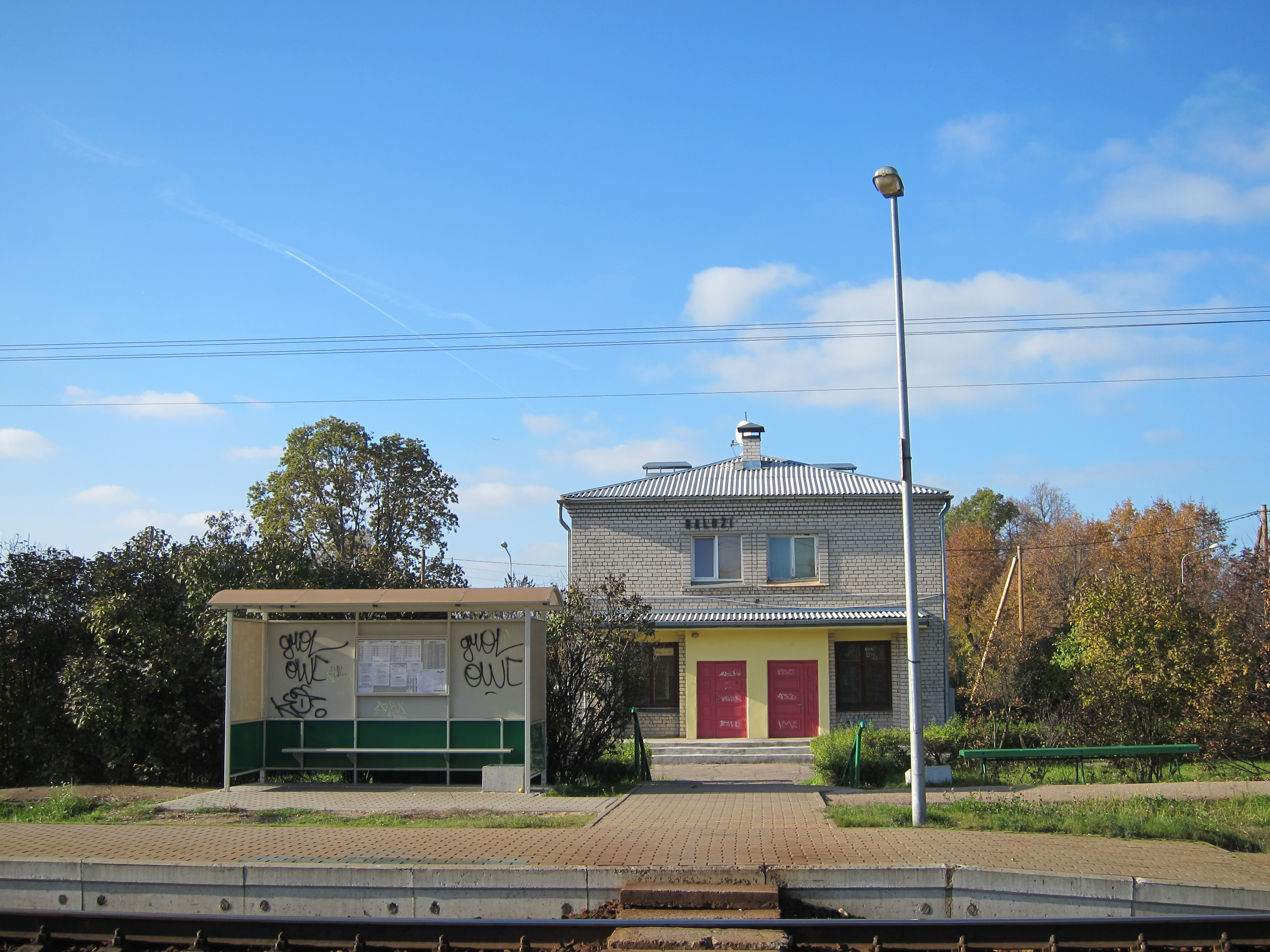

General information
- Location: Stacija Baloži 2, Stūnīši; Olaine parish, Olaine Municipality; Latvia
- Coordinates: 56°50′40.80″N 24°2′53.52″E
- Line: Riga – Jelgava Railway
- Platforms: 2
- Tracks: 2

History
- Opened: 1907
- Closed: 15 December 2024; 20 months ago
- Former names: Rollbusch

Former services
Preceding station	LDz	Following station
Jaunolaine towards Jelgava	Riga–Jelgava	Tīraine towards Riga
Location
- Location within Latvia

Baloži Station is a closed railway station on the Riga – Jelgava Railway which served the village of Stūnīši in Olaine Parish in Olaine Municipality south of Riga, Latvia.

Since 15 December 2024, the station has been closed and replaced by Medemciems Station, which is located c. 1.4 km further north.
