= Olaine Station =

Railway station in Olaine, Latvia

Olaine
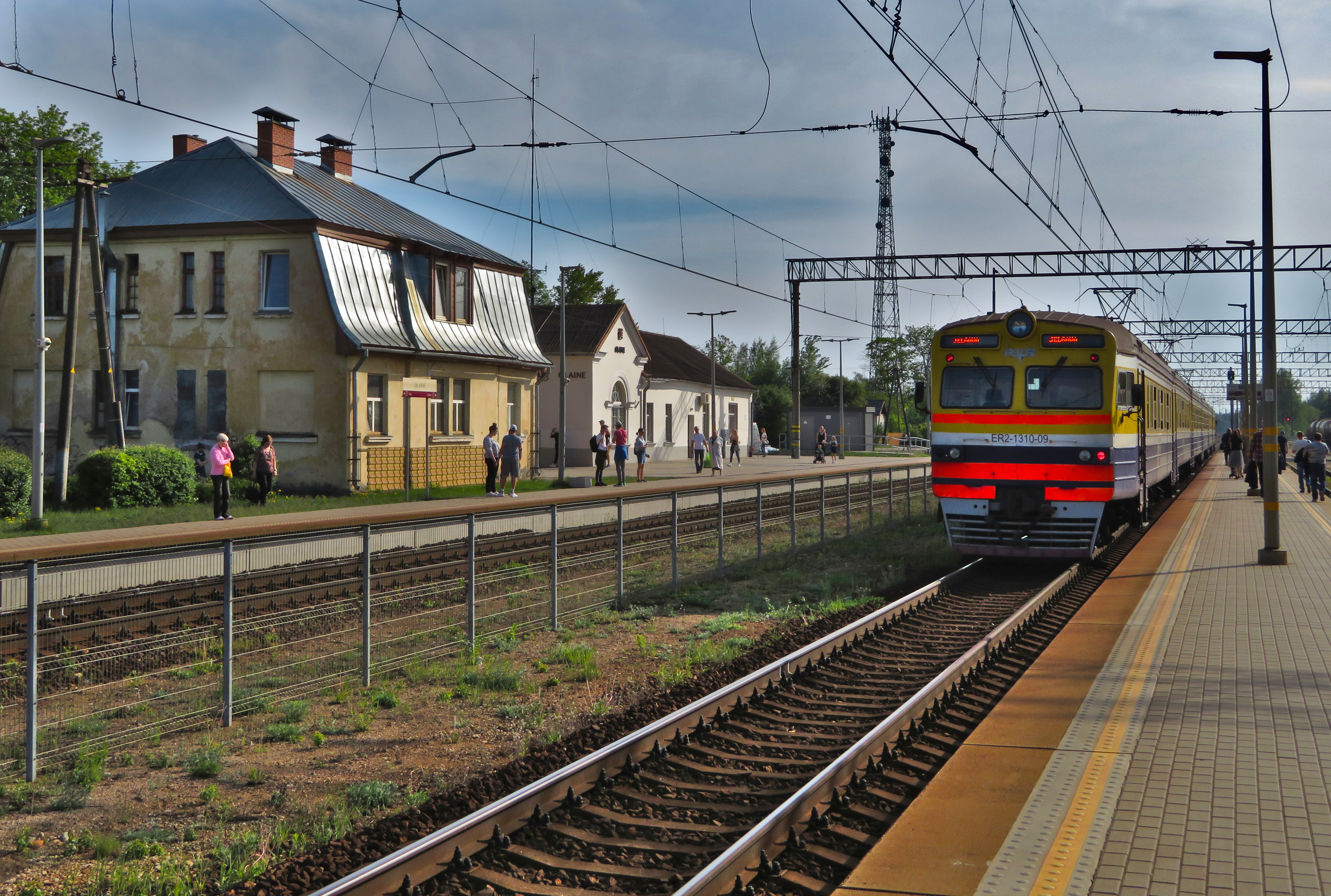
- Olaine Station in 2019

General information
- Location: Olaines stacija, Olaine; Olaine Municipality; Latvia
- Coordinates: 56°47′7.47″N 23°56′37.29″E
- Owner: Latvijas dzelzceļš (LDz)
- Platforms: 2
- Tracks: 5
- Train operators: Vivi

History
- Opened: 1868
- Electrified: 1972
- Former names: Olai

Services
Preceding station	LDz	Following station
Dalbe towards Jelgava	Riga–Jelgava	Jaunolaine towards Riga
Location

Olaine Station is a railway station serving the city of Olaine in the Vidzeme region of Latvia. The station is located on the 22nd kilometer of the Riga–Jelgava Railway. It was one of only four stations on the Riga–Jelgava route when it was initially opened on November 21, 1868.
