= Dalbe Station =

Railway station in Latvia

Dalbe
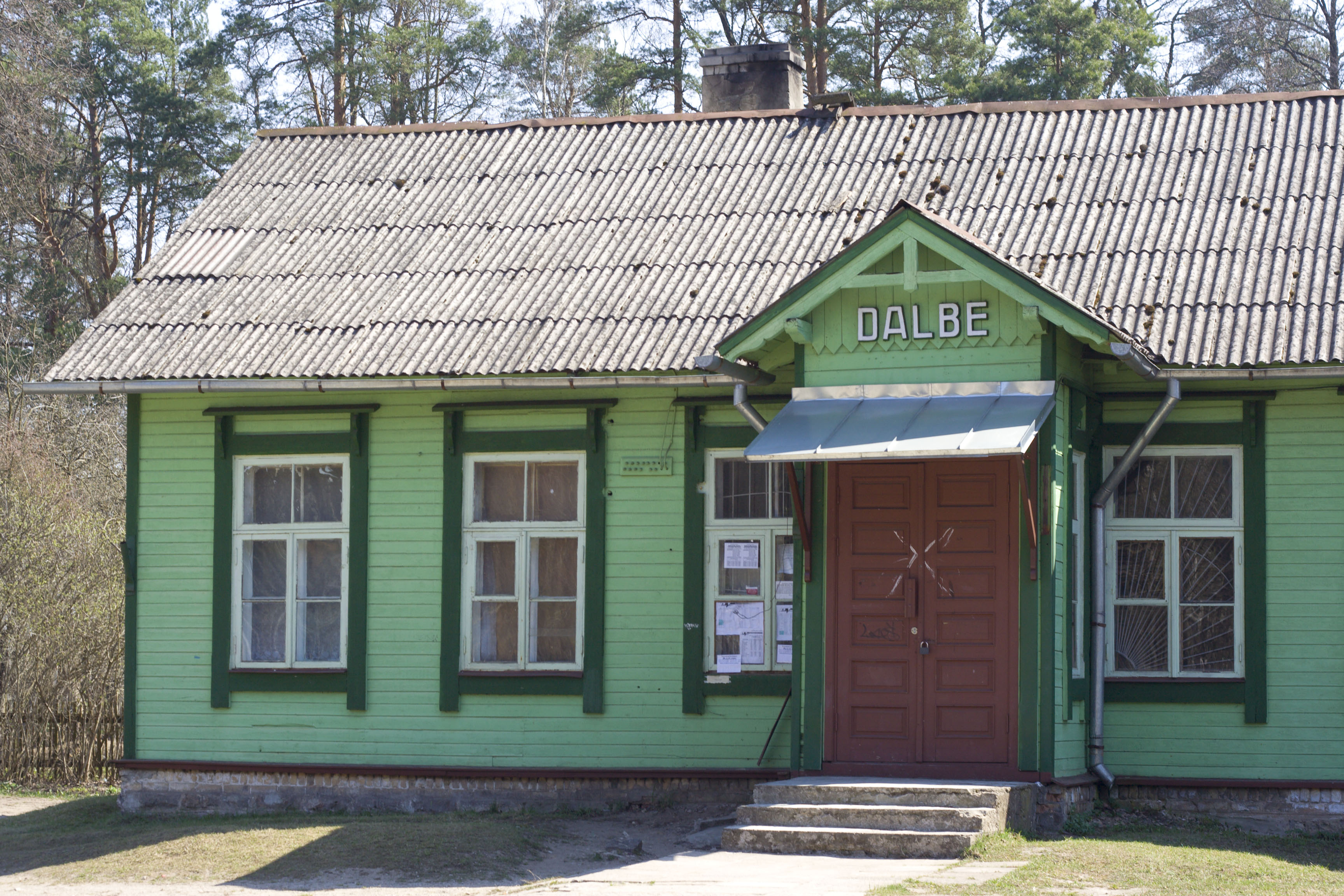

General information
- Location: Dalbe, Cena Parish, Jelgava Municipality; Latvia
- Coordinates: 56°44′29.19″N 23°52′29.97″E
- Platforms: 2
- Tracks: 2

History
- Opened: 1920
- Former names: Dolbing

Services
Preceding station	LDz	Following station
Cena towards Jelgava	Riga–Jelgava	Olaine towards Riga
Location

Dalbe Station is a railway station serving the village of Dalbe in the Semigallia region of Latvia. The station is located on the Riga–Jelgava railway line.
