= Turība Station =

Railway station in Latvia

Coordinates: 56.9111°N 24.0775°E

Biznesa augstskola Turība
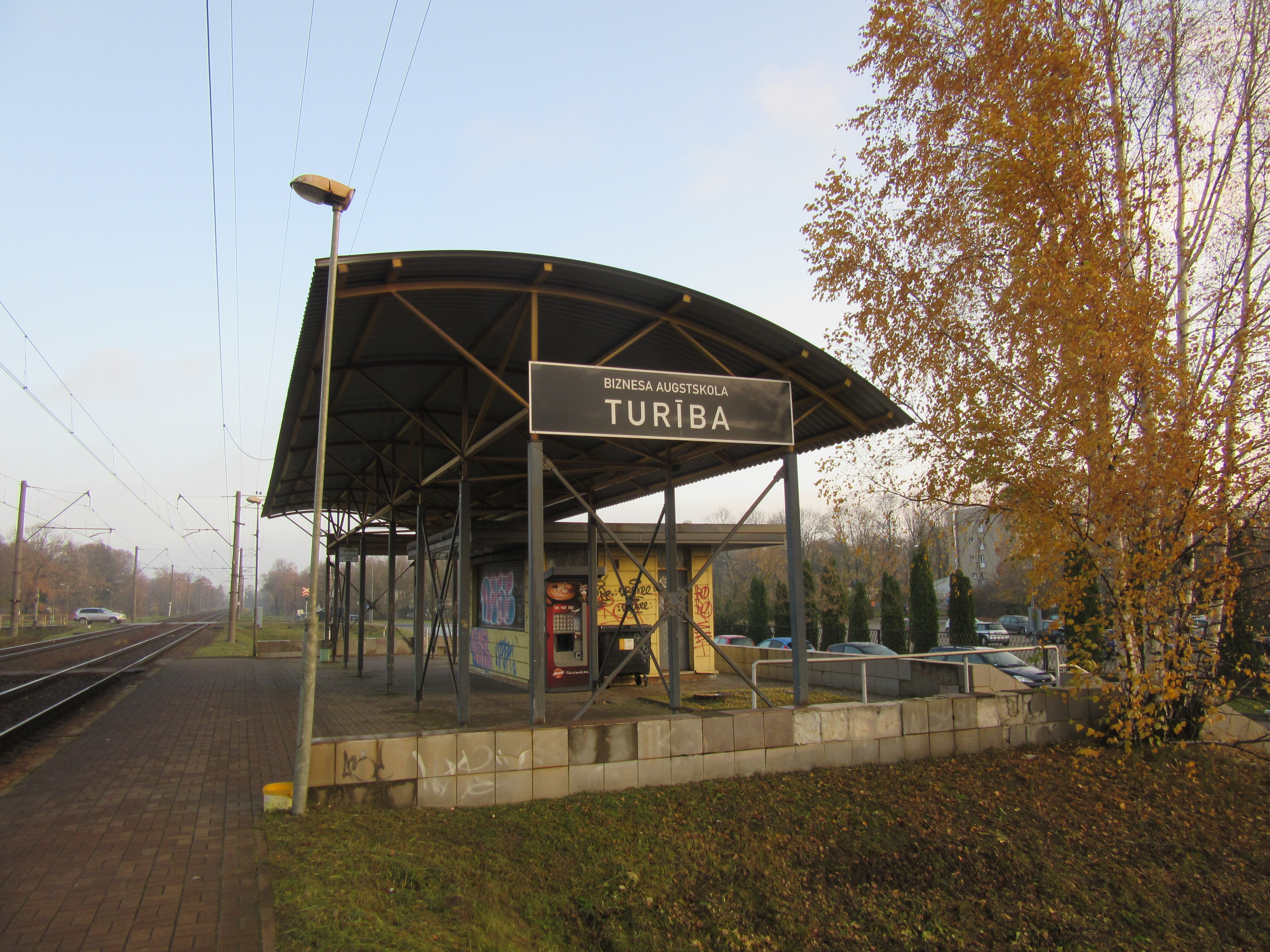
- Turība Station (2021)

General information
- Location: Zemgale Suburb, Rīga; Latvia
- Line(s): Riga–Jelgava Railway
- Distance: 6 kilometres (3.7 mi) from Riga

History
- Opened: August 29, 2003; 22 years ago

Services
Preceding station	LDz	Following station
Tīraine towards Jelgava	Riga–Jelgava	Bieriņi / Bērnu slimnīca towards Riga
Former services
Preceding station	LDz	Following station
Tīraine towards Jelgava	Riga–Jelgava	Atgāzene towards Riga
Location

Turība Station is a railway station in the Zemgale Suburb in Riga, Latvia, located on the western bank of the Daugava River. The station serves the Turība University, after which it is named.

The station is located on the Riga–Jelgava railway line, and all trains stop at the station, excluding diesel trains to Liepāja and Vilnius. It was opened on August 29, 2003.
