= Olaine =

Town and capital of Olaine Municipality, Latvia

- City
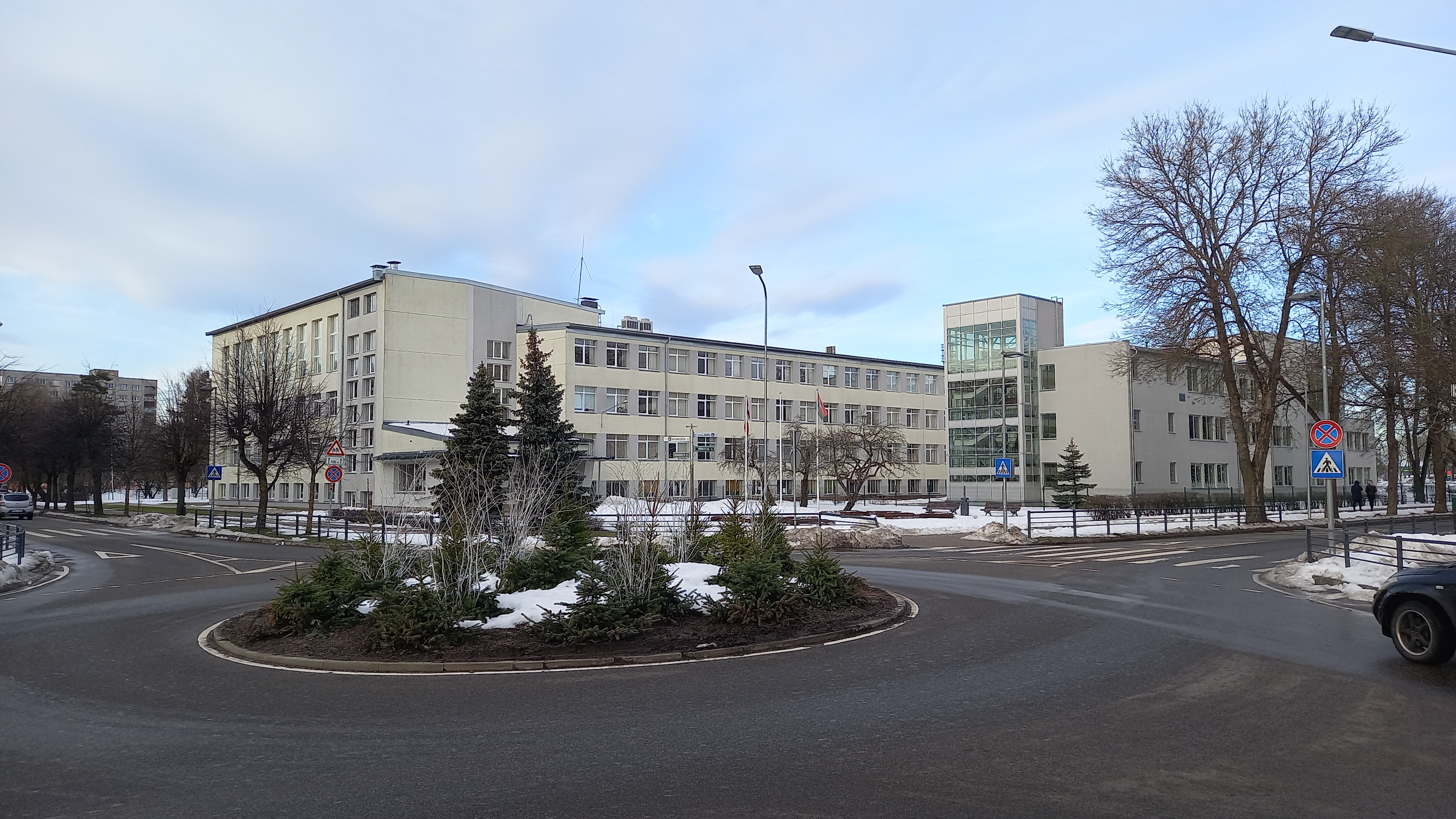

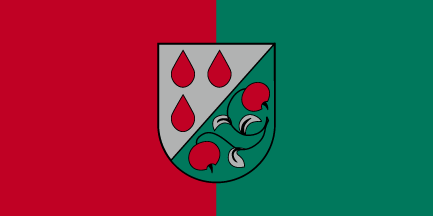
- Flag Coat of arms

- Location in Latvia
- Coordinates: 56°47′N 23°56′E
- Country: Latvia
- Municipality: Olaine Municipality
- Town rights: 1967

Government
  - Mayor: Andris Bergs (LSDSP)

Area
  - Total: 6.84 km^{2} (2.64 sq mi)
  - Land: 6.64 km^{2} (2.56 sq mi)
  - Water: 0.2 km^{2} (0.077 sq mi)

Population (2026)
  - Total: 9,580
  - Density: 1,440/km^{2} (3,740/sq mi)
- Time zone: UTC+2 (EET)
  - Summer (DST): UTC+3 (EEST)
- Postal code: LV-2114
- Calling code: +371 67
- Number of city council members: 11
- Website: http://www.olaine.lv

Olaine (German: Olai) is a city and the center of Olaine Municipality in the Vidzeme region of Latvia. Olaine gained town rights in 1967. The population in 2020 was 10,668.

== History ==
The name comes from the Saint Olaf Church (Swedish: Sankt Olai kyrka), built by the Olainīte stream, a Misa river tributary, under Swedish rule in the 17th century, at a place which is within the village now known as Jaunolaine ("New Olaine") some two kilometers away from the modern Olaine. An old cemetery remains at this site. After 1868, a railway stop "Olai" (now the Jaunolaine Station) was built here on the Riga–Mitau railway line. After Latvian independence, in 1919 "Olai" was renamed to "Olaine", in line with the Latvianisation of place names all over Latvia.

== Economy ==
=== Businesses ===
The history of modern Olaine is associated with the works at nearby peat bogs, taken into use on an industrial scale in 1939. Thereafter, more production facilities were built, increasing numbers of workers needed accommodation, and the first dwellings were built in what is currently known as Olaine in 1940. As of 2023 local peat processing is handled by the "Olaines kūdra" Ltd. ("Olaine Peat" Ltd.), a private company centrally managed together with 4 other Latvian peat companies by the German company “Kudras Substrates – Peat Moss”.

Olaine is home of Olpha, the second largest pharmaceutical company in Latvia.

== Infrastructure ==
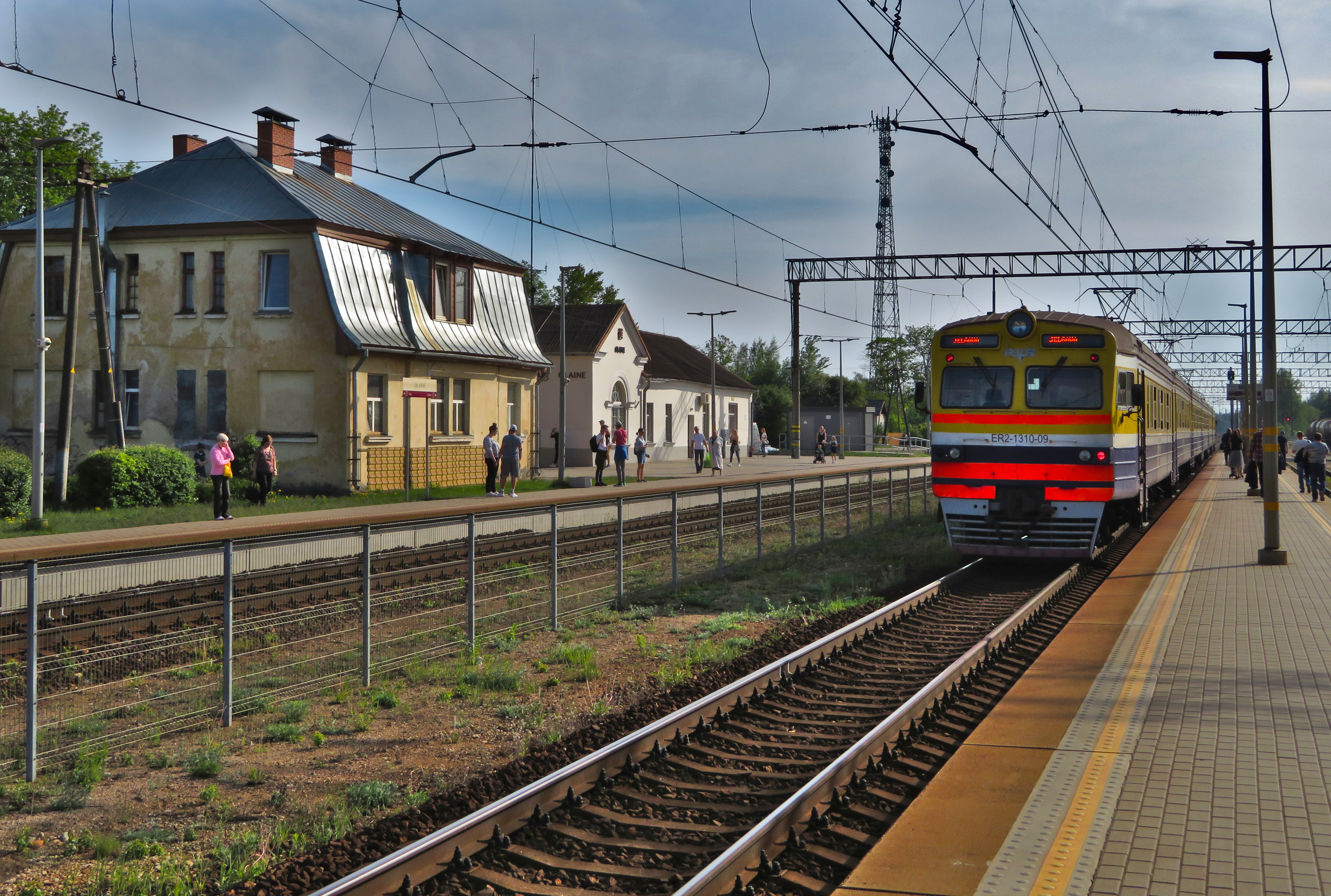
Olaine railway station

Olaine is served by Olaine railway station, located on the Riga–Jelgava railway line.

== Twin towns — sister cities ==
Olaine is twinned with:

- Karlskoga, Sweden
- Nowa Sarzyna, Poland
- Ödeshög, Sweden
- Riihimäki, Finland
- Vadstena, Sweden

== Notable people ==
- Dmitrijs Miļkevičs (born 1981), Latvian athlete
- Artūrs Ausējs (born 1990), a Latvian basketball player
- Rustams Begovs (born 1993), Latvian hockey player

== Literature ==
- Vilīte, Valda: Olaines pagasts (2008)

== See also ==
- List of cities in Latvia
