= Cena Station =

Railway station in Latvia

Cena
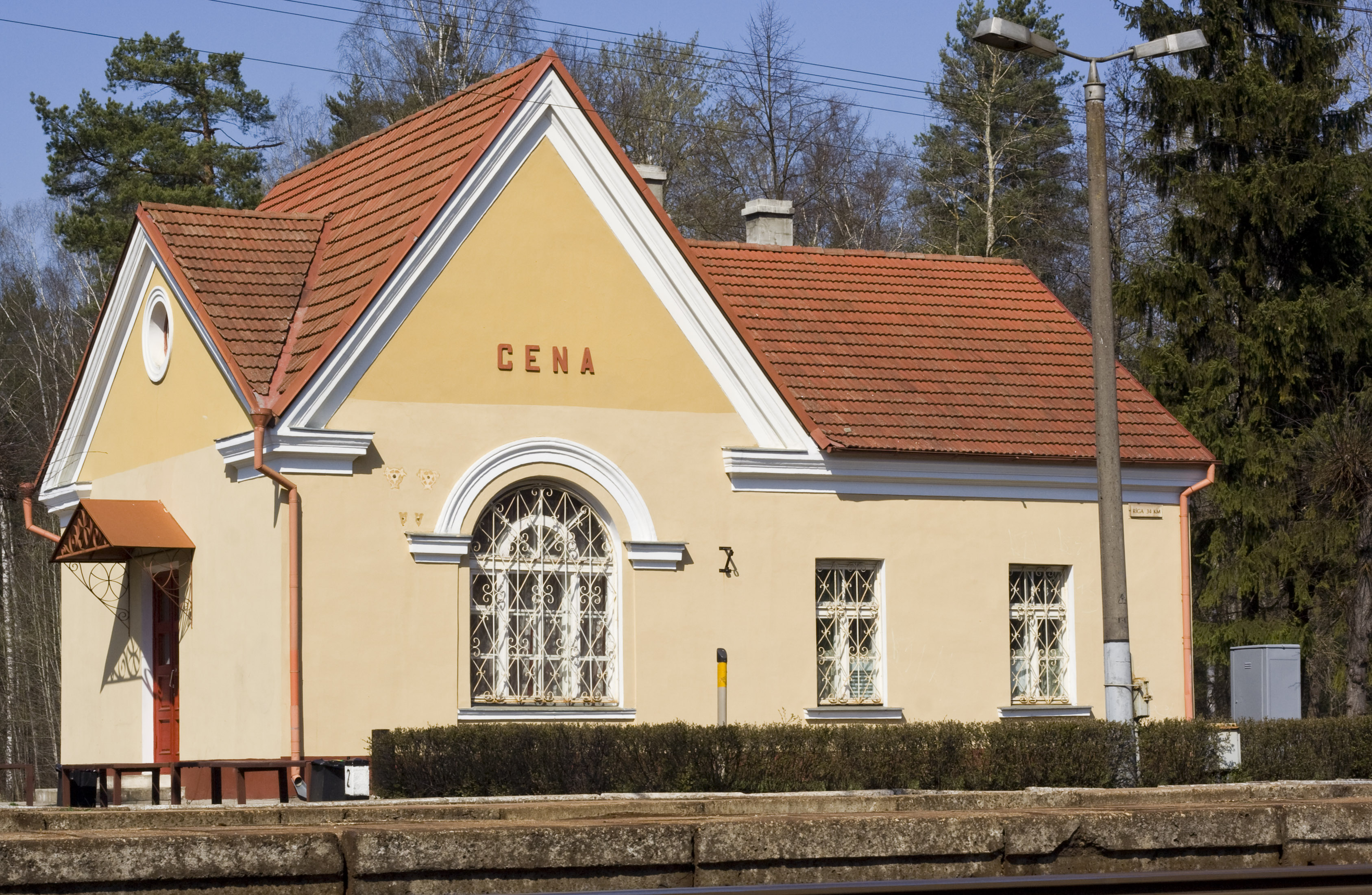

General information
- Location: Cena, Cena Parish, Jelgava Municipality; Latvia
- Coordinates: 56°42′29.67″N 23°49′57.33″E
- Platforms: 2
- Tracks: 4

History
- Opened: 1931
- Former names: Zauke

Services
Preceding station	LDz	Following station
Ozolnieki towards Jelgava	Riga–Jelgava	Dalbe towards Riga
Location

Cena Station is a railway station serving the small village of Cena in the Semigallia region of Latvia. The station is located on the Riga–Jelgava railway line. Not all trains stop at the station.
