= Ozolnieki Station =

Railway station in Latvia

Ozolnieki
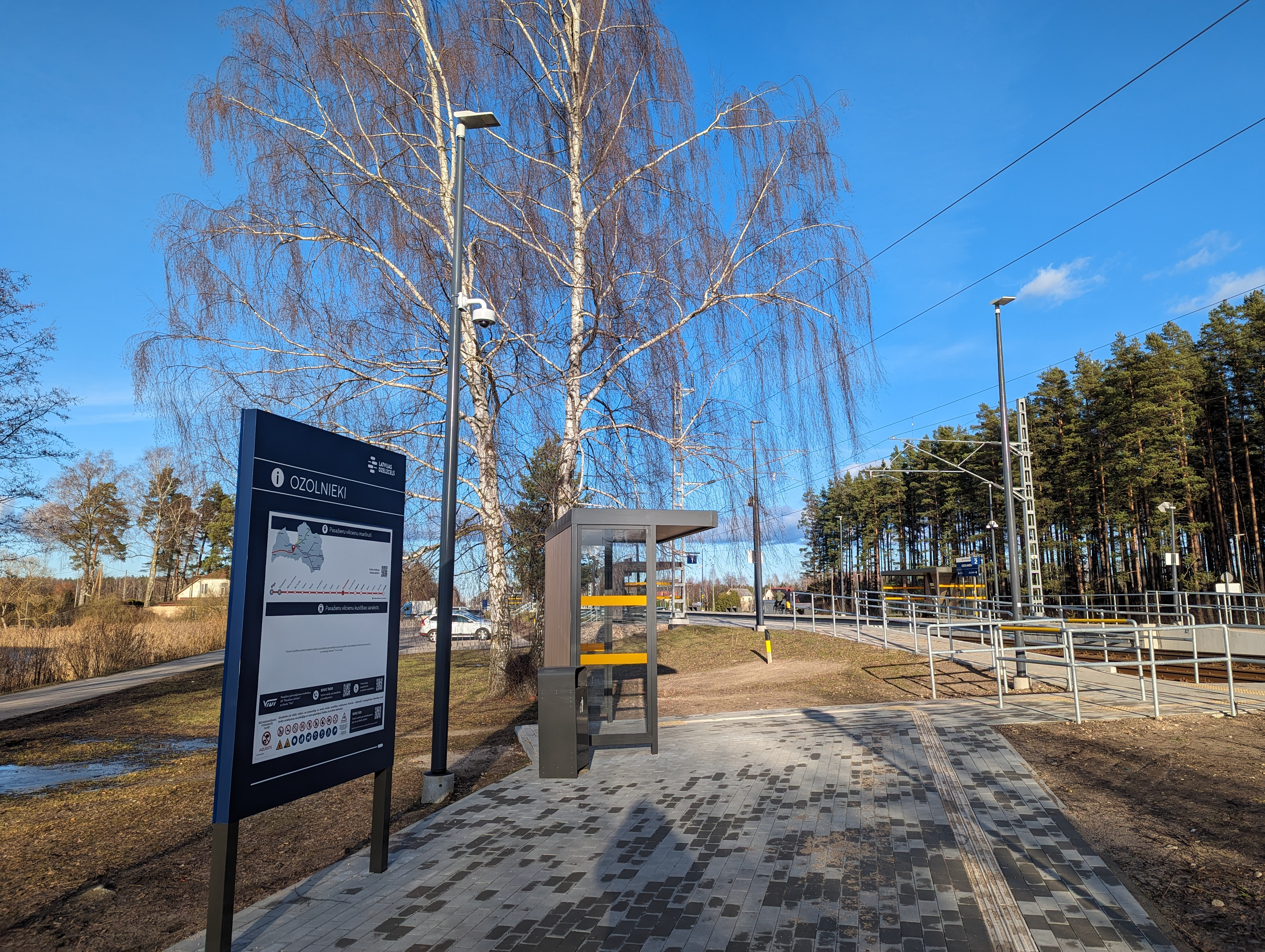

General information
- Location: Ozolnieki; Ozolnieki Parish, Jelgava Municipality; Latvia
- Coordinates: 56°41′10.78″N 23°48′21.24″E
- Platforms: 2
- Tracks: 2

History
- Opened: 1929

Services
Preceding station	LDz	Following station
Cukurfabrika towards Jelgava	Riga–Jelgava	Cena towards Riga
Location

Ozolnieki Station is a railway station serving the villages of Ozolnieki and Iecēni in the Semigallia region of Latvia. The station is located on the Riga–Jelgava railway line.
