= Tīraine Station =

Railway station in Latvia

Tīraine
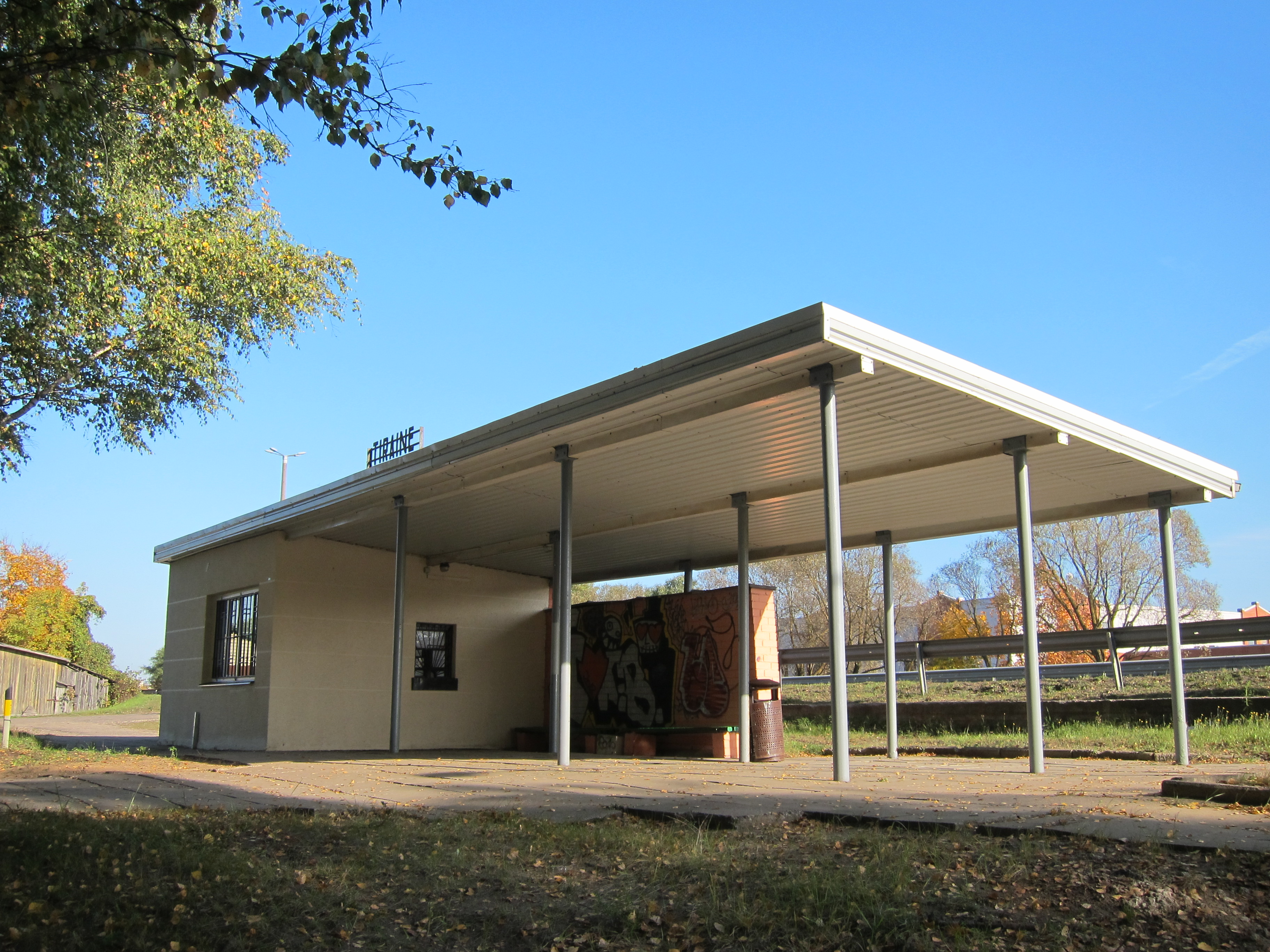

General information
- Location: Tīraines iela 1 Riga; Latvia
- Coordinates: 56°53′16.52″N 24°4′25.60″E
- Line: Riga–Jelgava
- Platforms: 2 platforms
- Tracks: 2 tracks

Construction
- Parking: No

History
- Opened: 1928
- Rebuilt: 1983
- Former names: Tīriņi

Services
Preceding station	LDz	Following station
Medemciems towards Jelgava	Riga–Jelgava	Turība towards Riga
Former services
Preceding station	LDz	Following station
Baloži towards Jelgava	Riga–Jelgava	Turība towards Riga
Location

Tīraine Station is a railway station in the southern outskirts of Riga, Latvia. The station is situated on the border of the city of Riga and serves the village of Tīraine in the adjacent Mārupe Municipality.

Tīraine station is located on the Riga–Jelgava Railway.
