= Jaunolaine Station =

Railway station in Latvia

Jaunolaine
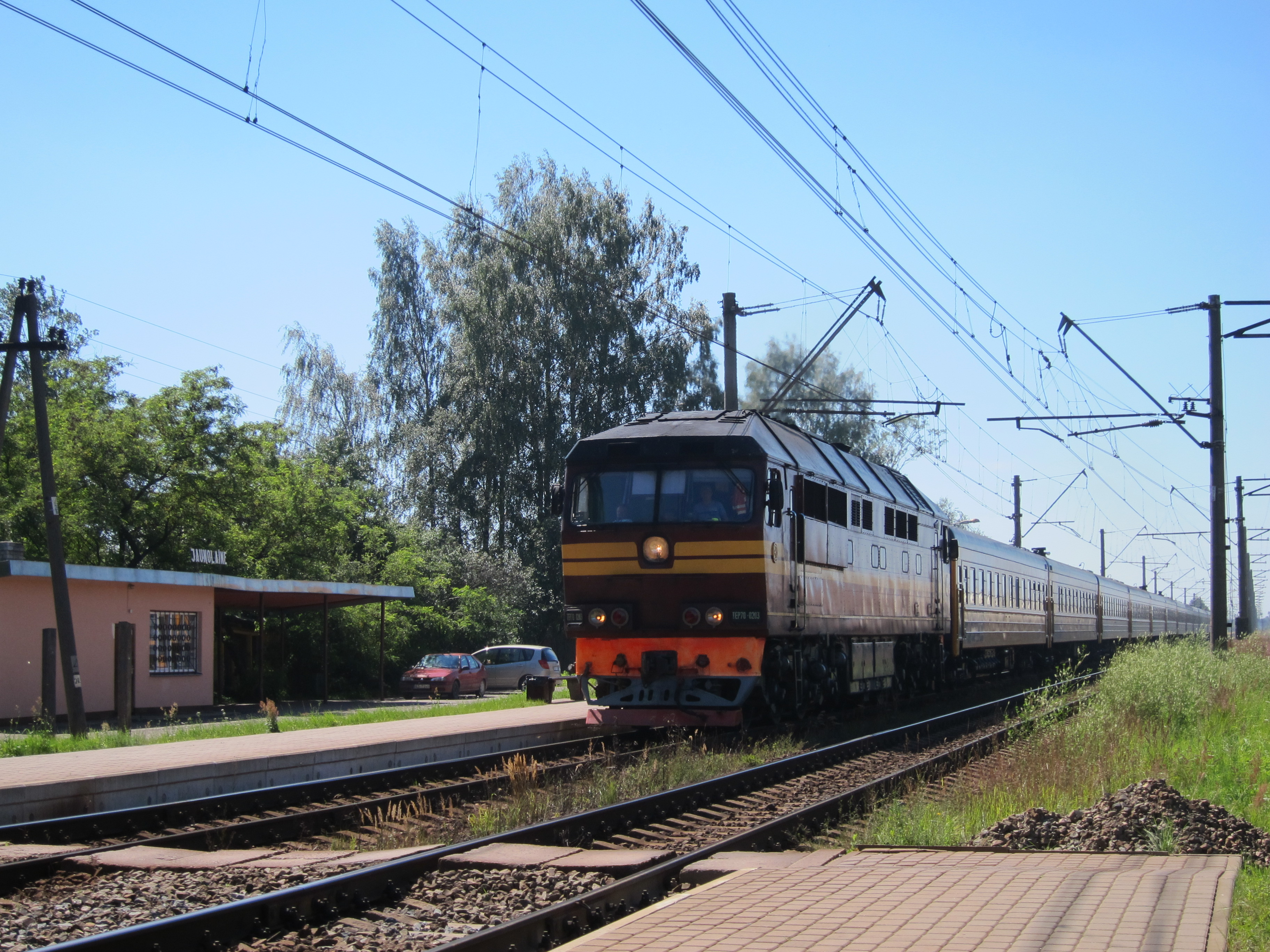

General information
- Location: Stacija Jaunolaine, Jaunolaine; Olaine Parish, Olaine Municipality; Latvia
- Coordinates: 56°48′16.20″N 23°58′48.99″E
- Owner: Latvijas dzelzceļš (LDz)
- Platforms: 2
- Tracks: 2
- Train operators: Vivi

History
- Opened: 1983

Services
Preceding station	LDz	Following station
Olaine towards Jelgava	Riga–Jelgava	Medemciems towards Riga
Location

Jaunolaine Station is a railway station serving the village of Jaunolaine in Olaine Parish in Olaine Municipality south of Riga, Latvia.

The stations is located on the Riga–Jelgava Railway.
