= Cukurfabrika Station =

Railway station in Latvia

Cukurfabrika
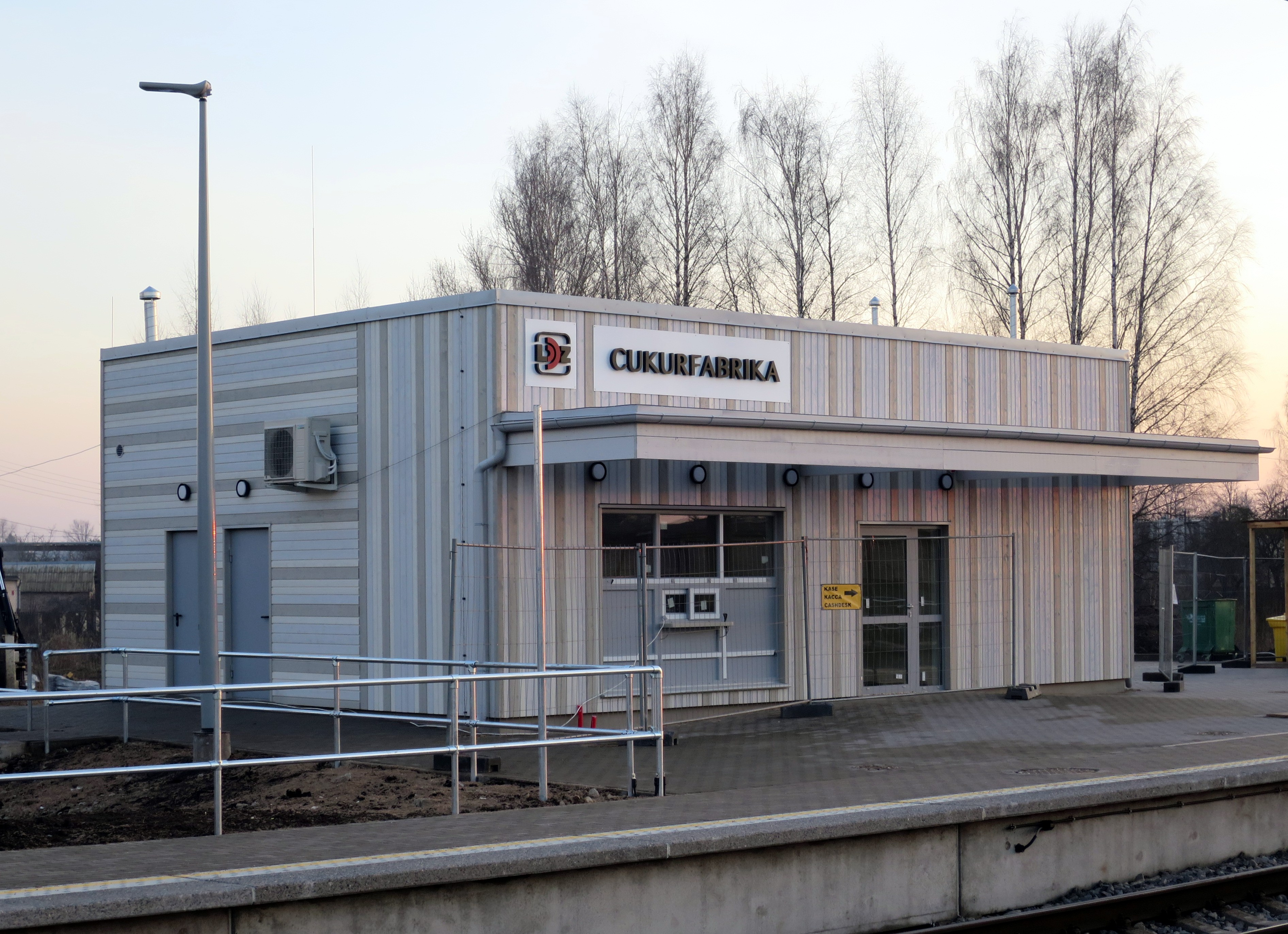

General information
- Location: Pārmiju iela 2 Jelgava, Latvia
- Coordinates: 56°39′11.60″N 23°45′32.53″E
- Line: Riga–Jelgava
- Platforms: 2
- Tracks: 2

History
- Opened: 1928

Services
Preceding station	LDz	Following station
Jelgava Terminus	Riga–Jelgava	Ozolnieki towards Riga
Location

Cukurfabrika Station is a railway station serving the city of Jelgava in the Semigallia region of Latvia. The station is located in the eastern part of the city on the right bank of the river Lielupe. It is situated on the Riga–Jelgava Railway. Electric trains to Jelgava stop at the station.
