= Jelgava–Meitene Railway =

Railway in Latvia

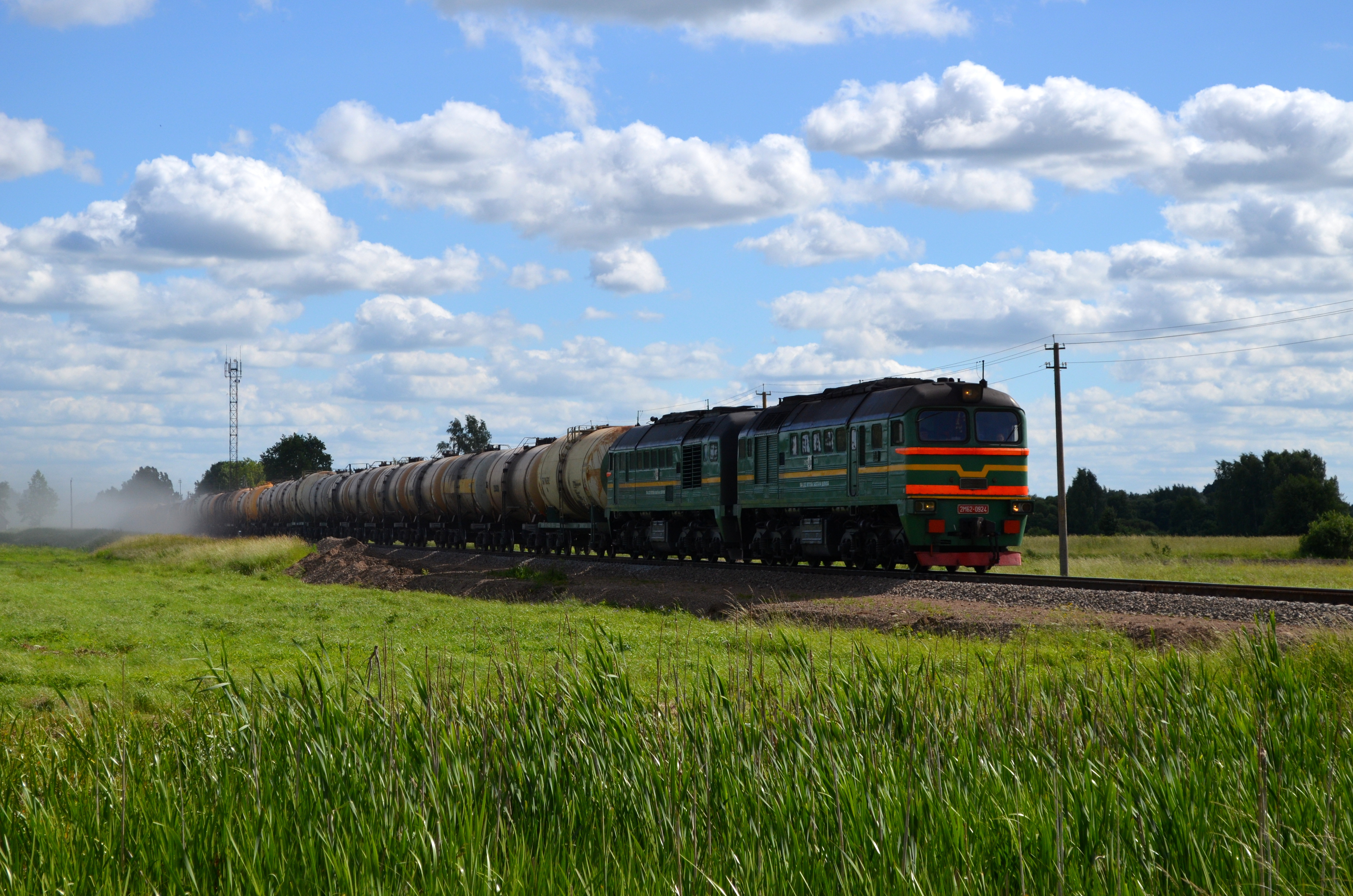

Overview
- Termini: Jelgava Station; Meitene Station

Service
- Operator(s): Latvian Railways

History
- Opened: 1915

Technical
- Line length: 33 km (20.51 mi)
- Track gauge: 1,524 mm (5 ft)

The Jelgava–Meitene Railway is a 33 kilometres (21 mi) long, 1,524 mm (5 ft) gauge railway built in the early 20th century to connect Jelgava in Latvia and Tilsit (now Sovetsk, Kaliningrad Oblast). Past the border with Lithuania at Latvia's Meitene Station, the line continues over Šarkiai to connect with the Vilnius–Klaipėda Railway at Šiauliai.

== See also ==
Railway lines in Latvia in 2016.

- Rail transport in Latvia
- History of rail transport in Latvia

== Bibliography ==
- Altbergs, T.; Augustāne, K.; Pētersone, I. (2009). Dzelzceļi Latvijā [Railways in Latvia] (in Latvian). Jumava. ISBN 978-9984-38-698-0.
