= Olpha =

Company based in Latvia

Olpha JSC
- Type: Public
- Industry: Pharmaceuticals
- Predecessor: Olaine Chemical-Pharmaceutical Plant
- Founded: 10 October 1972
- Headquarters: Rūpnīcu 5, Olaine, Latvia
- Area served: Worldwide
- Revenue: 113,537,000 euro (2022)
- Net income: 18,143,000 euro (2022)
- Total assets: 196,314,000 euro (2022)
- Owner: JSC AB City
- Number of employees: 1,054 (2022)
- Website: http://www.olpha.eu

JSC Olpha (formerly JSC Olainfarm) is a Latvian pharmaceutical company and drug manufacturer. In June 2024, Olainfarm announced a rebranding to Olpha.

The company traces its origins to the Olaine Chemical-Pharmaceutical Plant. Its first synthesis of furagin was carried out on 10 October 1972, a date the company identifies as the start of its operations under the name Olaines ķīmiski-farmaceitiskā rūpnīca.

Olainfarm produces over 60 final dosage forms, 25 active pharmaceutical ingredients and 20 intermediates. Their key areas of specialization in final dosage forms include neurology (cholinesterase inhibitors, anxiolytics, psychostimulants, nootropics), cardiology (antiarrhythmics, energy metabolism enhancers), infectology (original nitrofurantoine derivatives and antivirals) and allergology (fast acting antihistamines).

Olainfarm is certified in accordance with the requirements of the EU GMP for APIs and FDFs, the U.S. cGMP for certain APIs (FDA), TGA for FDFs (Australia), CEP for certain APIs, ISO 14001 Environmental Management System and ISO 17025 Laboratory Management System.

== Patron of the University of Latvia ==
Olainfarm is a silver patron of the University of Latvia Foundation. Since 2012, Olainfarm has the donated scholarships to the University of Lativia for pharmacy students of the Faculty of Chemistry and the Faculty of Medicine of the University of Latvia.

== History ==
On 4 December 1965, the Council of Ministers of the Latvian Soviet Socialist Republic adopted a decision on construction of a chemical-pharmaceutical factory in the town of Olaine.

In 1968, the construction of the factory was commenced.

The first operation of furagin synthesis was carried out on 10 October 1972. That day is considered as the day of commencement of the operation of the company, which at that time was named Olaines ķīmiski-farmaceitiskā rūpnīca (Olaine Chemical-Pharmaceutical Plant).

In 1976, Olaine Chemical-Pharmaceutical Plant became the leading manufacturer in Latvbiofarm association. The production capacity of the enterprise made it possible to supply all the existing factories-manufacturers in the territory of the Soviet Union with active chemical ingredients and intermediates of corresponding groups.

In 1980, synthesis of 15 products was developed. After a while, the management of the enterprise made a decision also to produce finished forms of medicines.

In 1991, Latvia restores its independence after being occupied by the Soviet Union. These changes affected also the operation of Olaine Chemical-Pharmaceutical Plant; therefore, a decision was made to develop the strongest lines of synthesis (amantadine, quinuclidinone, and other derivatives) for selling products to Western countries.

State enterprise Olaine Chemical-Pharmaceutical Plant was privatized in 1997. As a result of the privatization, the enterprise was reorganized into the joint stock company Olainfarm, and its shares were listed on the secondary list of Riga Stock Exchange.

In 2001, after successful audits conducted by such well-known companies as Cilag (Switzerland), Johnson & Johnson (USA) and Sanofi (France), the Company entered the global market as its actual participant in production of active chemical ingredients.

In 2002, a certificate was obtained according to the inspection requirements of the U.S. Food and Drug Administration (FDA).

From 2003 to 2004 a major reconstruction of the manufacturing plant was finished in compliance with the requirements of Good Manufacturing Practice of the European Union.

On 30 July 2004, JSC Olainfarm obtained a Good Manufacturing Practice certificate of compliance. This certificate symbolized the start of a new period in the company's history.

In 2005, Shareholders of JSC Olainfarm decided to increase the fixed capital of the company by 3 million Lats, to 13.25 million Lats.

In 2006, considering the positive development dynamics of the company and the quality of investor relations, shares of the company were transferred to the most prestigious Main List of the Baltics. Popular anti-virus preparation Remantadīns® (Remantadine) was registered as the first of the company's manufactured medicaments in Poland.

In 2007, JSC Olainfarm received the Baltic Stock Exchange award for the best investor relations on the Internet in 2007.

In 2008, JSC Olainfarm opened a representation office in Vietnam and started an ambitious sale promotion programme in important sales markets.

At the award ceremony of newspaper Dienas bizness for Top 500 most successful companies in Latvia in 2009, JSC Olainfarm received the special award from NASDAQ OMX Riga as the company of the stock exchange with the highest share price increase from early 2009 to 1 November. The company's share price in 2009 increased by 160%.

In 2010, The Company registered its representation offices in Serbia and Tajikistan. The first registered product in Serbia was anti-virus preparation Remavir®.

In 2011, When the sales promotion programme, which started in 2008, showed significant results, the Company set even higher new records of profit and turnover. For the first time in its history, the company's shareholders decided to pay dividends in the amount of 10% from the previous year's profit. Olainfarm started building its own chain of pharmacies - Latvijas aptieka.

In 2013, Olainfarm acquired controlling stake in the leading Latvian food supplement company Silvanols.

In 2014, Olainfarm won the Export Champion 2014 Award at the competition organized by the Latvian Economics Ministry and the Investment and Development Agency of Latvia (LIAA).

On 13 January 2015, JSC Olainfarm opened the newly finished drug manufacturing plant, which was created with investments of 9.6 million. It consists of a nitrofurane production facility, a production facility of small finished drug series, and a laboratory for the development of finished drug forms.

On 20 January 2016, JSC Olainfarm concluded an agreement on the purchase of 100% of capital shares of the manufacturer of organic cosmetics Kiwi Cosmetics Ltd. On 28 January, JSC Olainfarm receives an award in the decade nomination "Best 10-year performance" for the biggest share price growth and an increase the Baltic Market Awards ranking. On 12 May 2016, JSC Olainfarm signed an agreement about acquiring 100% shares in Tonus Elast Ltd., producer of elastic medical products.

On 13 July 2017, Longgo, a subsidiary of JSC Olainfarm was founded, offering modern natural products for health and well-being.

On 21 July, JSC Olainfarm was registered in the Register of Enterprises of the Republic of Latvia as the only owner of LLC Olaines veselības centrs ('Olaine Health Center'). The LLC (renamed OlainMed in January 2018) provides outpatient healthcare services in Olaine.

In 2017, JSC Olainfarm receives the award from the Employers' Confederation of Latvia (LDDK) as the best employer in the Riga region. The company also received this award in 2015.

Valērijs Maligins, long-term chairman of the board and main shareholder of JSC Olainfarm, died on 9 December 2017.

In 2018, the producer of products of natural origin, LONGGO, was merged with SIA Silvanols, and on July 6, SIA LONGGO was excluded from the Enterprise Register.

On May 6 2020, the company SIA Pharma Invest submitted the prospectus of AS Olainfarm's voluntary share buyback offer to the Financial and Capital Market Commission in order to receive permission to acquire a 10% equity stake. The owners of Pharma Invest are Reinis Martinsons (90%) and SIA Prudentia Private Equity Partners (10%).

On June 17 2021, the management of the company partially changed and Juris Bundulis was elected as the chairman of the board.

In January 2022, AS "Olainfarm" withdrew from the stock exchange.

In June 2024, JSC Olainfarm announced a rebranding to Olpha. The company said that the change would be introduced gradually because pharmaceutical regulation also required changes to medicine registration certificates.

== Subsidiaries and associated companies ==
- Latvijas aptieka Ltd., pharmaceutical retail
- Silvanols Ltd., producer of natural food supplement, medical devices and OTC medicines
- Tonus Elast Ltd., producer of elastic medical products
- Rīgas Farmaceitiskā fabrika Ltd., food supplement

== Governance and management ==
Supervisory Council

- Jānis Buks – Chairperson of the Supervisory Board
- Andrejs Leibovičs – Member of the Supervisory Board
- Roberts Tavjevs – Member of the Supervisory Board
- Vadims Telica – Member of the Supervisory Board
- Sergejs Korņijenko – Member of the Supervisory Board

Management Board

- Juris Bundulis - Chairman Of the Board
- Andris Jegorovs- Member of the Board
- Jānis Leimanis - Member of the Board
