= History of rail transport in Latvia =

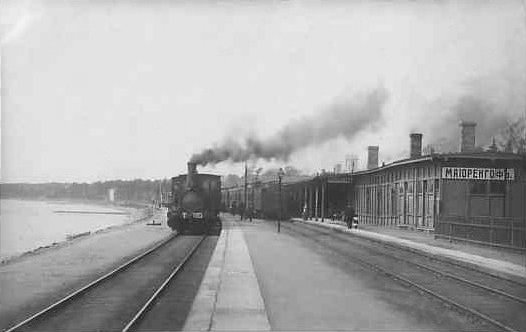
Majorenhof (today: Majori) railway station at Jūrmala, Latvia, c. 1900

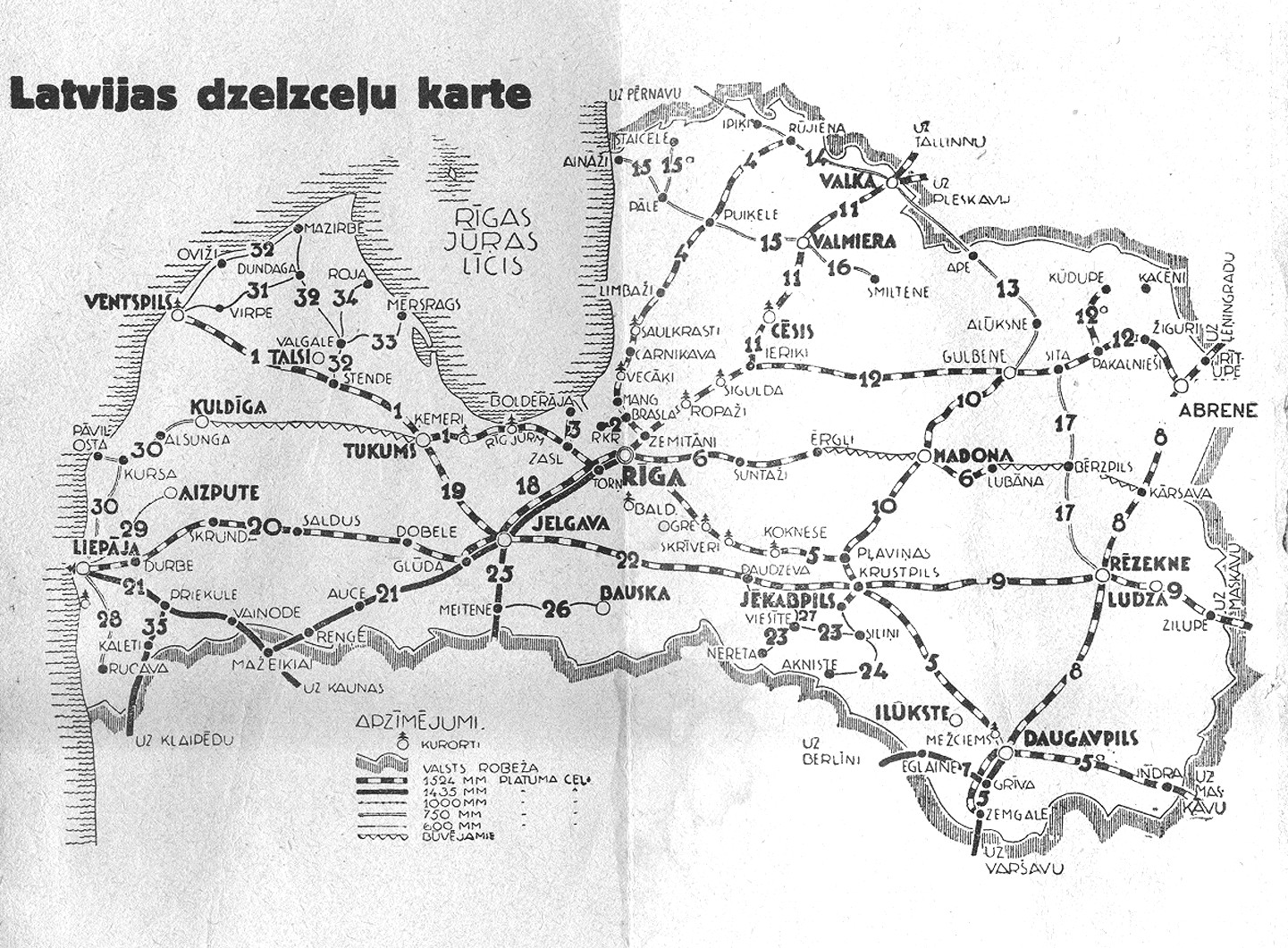
Map of Latvian railways in the 1930s, showing existing and planned lines

The history of rail transport in Latvia began with the construction in 1860 of a railway from Pytalovo to Dinaburg (now Daugavpils), 160 km in length, as part of the Saint Petersburg–Warsaw Railway.

More intensive development of railways in Latvia commenced the following year, 1861, when the 232 km long Riga - Dinaburg railway was opened. It connected with the Saint Petersburg–Warsaw Railway, and thus joined the Latvian railways with the Russian rail network. For the rest of the second half of the nineteenth century, the intensive construction of railways continued. Lines constructed during that period included Dinaburg–Radviliškis, Mitau (now Jelgava)–Muravyovo (Mažeikiai), and others.

From the 1890s, narrow gauge lines (750 mm (2 ft 5 1/2 in)) were built to complement the broad-gauge lines (1,524 mm (5 ft), also known as the Russian gauge). Most of the narrow-gauge railways were later converted to broad gauge, but then dismantled in the second half of the twentieth century.

During World War I, the Ober Ost German military administration built new narrow gauge and standard (European) 1435 mm gauge lines for the suppply of its forces in the territory of mainly Western and Central Latvia (Courland, Semigallia etc.). Rail lines that were converted or built in the 1,435 mm (4 ft 8 1/2 in) gauge included the Riga–Jelgava–Mažeikiai Railway (including the modern-day Riga–Jelgava Railway), Jelgava–Šiauliai–Tilsit Railway (including the current Jelgava–Meitene Railway), the Liepāja–Romny Railway (the now-partially-abandoned Liepāja–Vaiņode Railway) and the Priekule–Kalēti–Klaipėda Railway (the now-closed Priekule–Kalēti Railway).

During the Latvian War of Independence, the Railway High Board (Latvian: Dzelzceļu virsvalde) of Latvia took over the maintenance and management of the Latvian railway network with its founding on 5 August 1919. The Railway High Board also founded the state-owned rail passenger company Latvijas valsts dzelzceļi (or Latvijas dzelzceļi; 'Latvian State Railways'), an indirect predecessor of the modern Pasažieru vilciens transportation company. From 1920, the interwar independent Republic of Latvia had to rebuild the destroyed railway infrastructure and build new lines. The latter included the Jelgava–Liepāja Railway, Riga–Ērgļi Railway and the Zemitāni–Skulte (Riga–Rūjiena) Railway. In 1925, a Russian gauge second track was built along the Riga-Jelgava railway for national use along the standard-gauge track, which served as the last leg of the popular international Nord Express train line from Western Europe.

After the Soviet occupation of Latvia in 1940, the Soviet authorities dissolved the Latvian Railway High Board and transferred its assets to the Soviet railways. Plans to bring the railway system in line with the Soviet one were suspended due to the German occupation of Latvia during World War II from 1941 to 1944/1945, at the start of which all of the remaining Russian gauge railway lines in Latvia were converted into the standard gauge in around 6 months by 1942. After the start of the second Soviet occupation of Latvia in the end of World War II, all of the railway lines in Latvia were converted back to the Russian gauge, which has been the case ever since.

== See also ==
- History of rail transport
- History of Latvia
- Latvian Railways
- Rail transport in Latvia
