= Olaine Parish =

Parish in Olaine Municipality, Latvia

- parish of Latvia
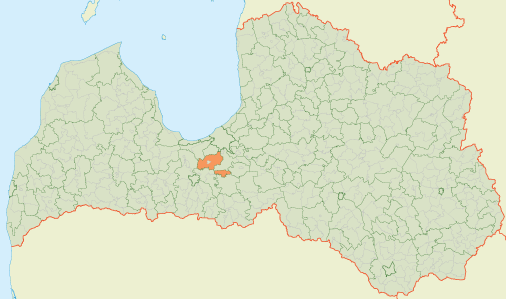
- 56°47′46″N 23°56′57″E
- Country: Latvia

Area
  - Total: 290.44 km^{2} (112.14 sq mi)
  - Land: 290.44 km^{2} (112.14 sq mi)
  - Water: 11.38 km^{2} (4.39 sq mi)

Population (1 January 2025)
  - Total: 11,023
  - Density: 37.953/km^{2} (98.297/sq mi)

Olaine Parish (Latvian: Olaine pagasts) is an administrative unit of Olaine Municipality, Latvia. The administrative center is Jaunolaine.

The territory of Olaine Parish is defined by Latvian law as belonging partly to the Vidzeme region and partly to Semigallia.
