= Rail transport in Latvia =

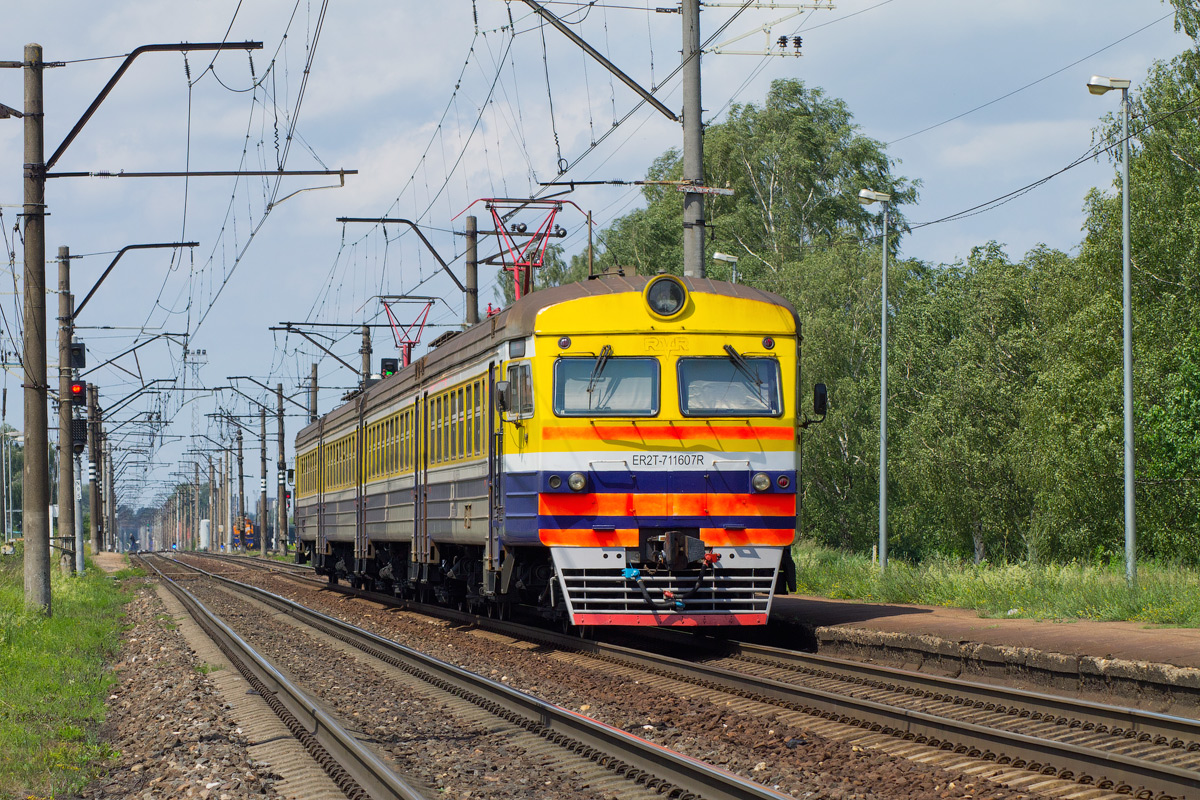
RVR ER2Т-7116 of Pasažieru vilciens en route between Šķirotava (Riga) and Salaspils, 2016

Rail transport in Latvia is primarily conducted on 1,520 mm (4 ft 11 27/32 in) broad-gauge railways. The main railway company is the state-owned Latvijas dzelzceļš (LDz), with its subsidiary Pasažieru vilciens (PV) providing passenger services.

== History ==
Historically, Latvia had lots of different rail gauges, most notably 1,435 mm (4 ft 8 1/2 in) standard gauge and 750 mm (2 ft 5 1/2 in) narrow gauge. These were gradually replaced by the Russian gauge after the Soviet occupation of the Baltic states.

The Rail Baltica project aims to connect Latvia and the other Baltic states to the European standard gauge by approximately 2030. Ten regional stations are planned in the section from Bauska to Salacgrīva.

Although PV has been a monopolist in passenger train, in February 2022 the Road Transport Administration of the Ministry of Transport of Latvia announced the first market survey on potential private rail passenger service providers.

== Rail links with adjacent countries ==
- — Belarus, same gauge (1520 mm)
- — Estonia, compatible gauge (1524 mm)
- — Lithuania, same gauge (1520 mm)
- — Russia, same gauge (1520 mm)

== International passenger services ==
Direct passenger trains between Vilnius and Riga operated until January 2004. From September 2018 until March 2020, the two cities were also linked by a Ukrainian railway train running between Kyiv and Riga. A new direct passenger rail connection between Vilnius and Riga, operated by LTG Link, launched on 27 December 2023. Since January 2025, a coordinated Tallinn–Tartu–Valga–Riga–Vilnius connection has linked Estonia, Latvia and Lithuania by rail, with services operated by Elron, Vivi and LTG Link on different sections of the route.

== Rail Baltica ==
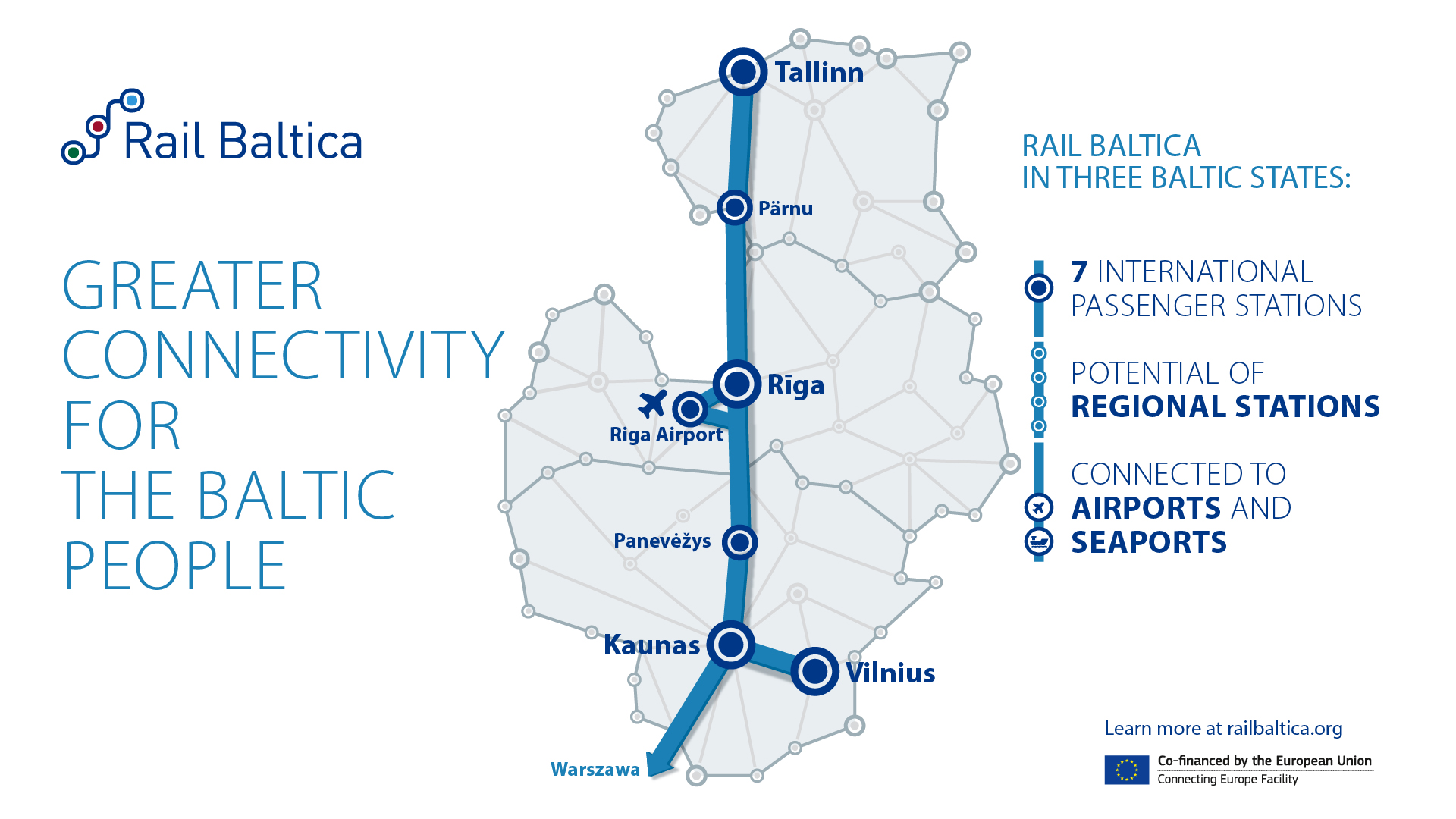
Infographic of the Rail Baltica project

Rail Baltica is an ongoing greenfield railway infrastructure project which will link all Baltic States, including Latvia, Poland and, eventually, Finland. Being a part of the Trans-European Transport Networks (TEN-T), it is one of the priority projects of the European Union. It will introduce standard-gauge high-speed rail with an operating speed of 249 km/h for passenger trains. As of 2023, the Rail Baltica project completion is scheduled for 2030, with a start of services on some of the sections in 2028.

== Conversion to standard gauge ==
In 2022, the European Union proposed to convert all non-standard gauges in Europe to standard gauge. The Latvian government believes it would require major EU funding to implement.

== See also ==
- History of rail transport in Latvia
- Narrow gauge railways in Latvia
- Rail Baltica
- Transport in Latvia
