= Olaine Municipality =

Municipality of Latvia

Coordinates: 56.7722°N 24.0019°E

Olaine Municipality Olaines novads
- Municipality
- Flag Coat of arms

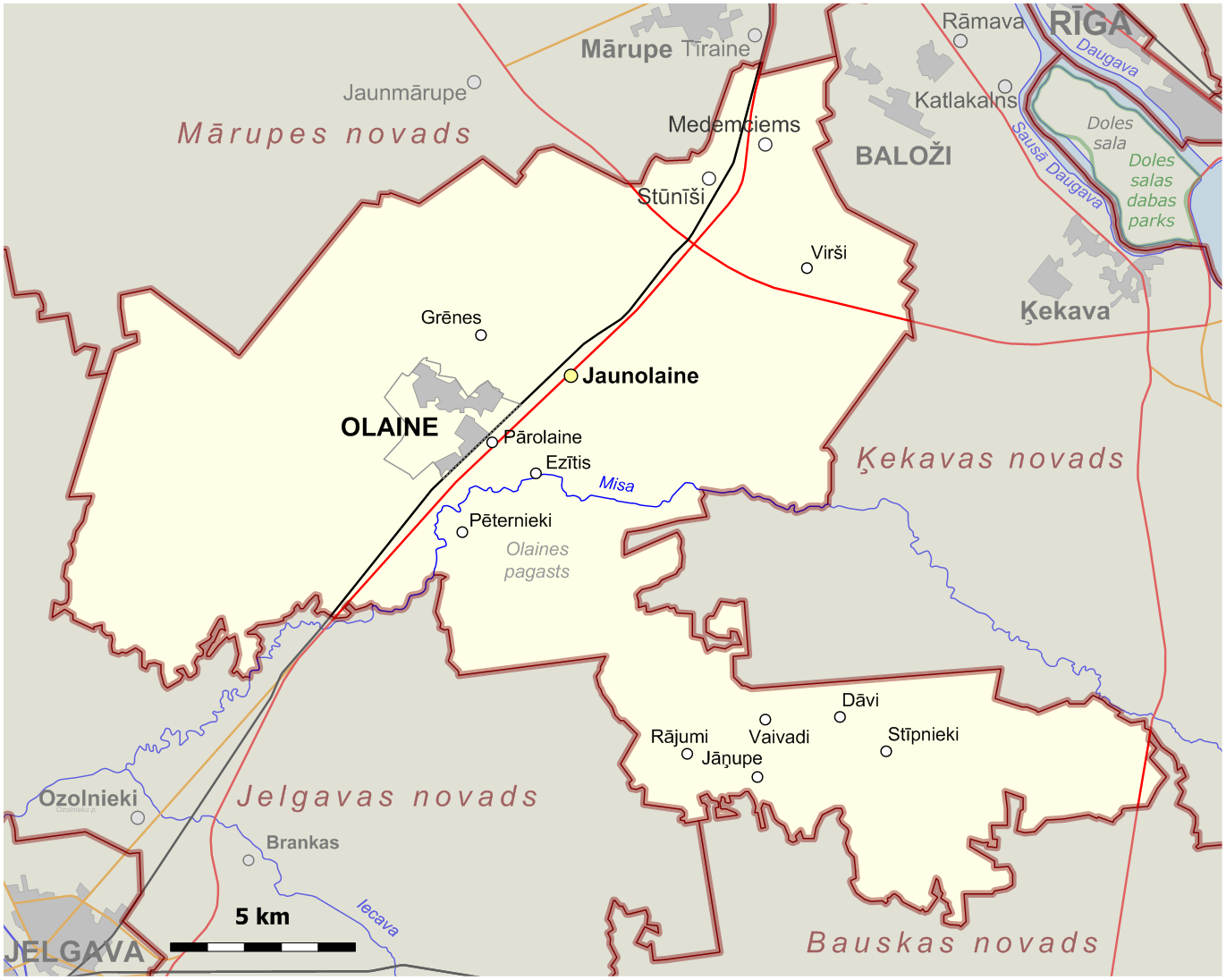
- Country: Latvia
- Formed: 2009
- Centre: Olaine

Government
  - Council Chair: Andris Bergs (LSDSP)

Area
  - Total: 308.66 km^{2} (119.17 sq mi)
  - Land: 291.62 km^{2} (112.60 sq mi)
  - Water: 17.04 km^{2} (6.58 sq mi)

Population (2026)
  - Total: 21,062
  - Density: 72.224/km^{2} (187.06/sq mi)
- Website: www.olaine.lv

Olaine Municipality (Latvian: Olaines novads) is a municipality in Latvia. The municipality was formed in 2009 by merging Olaine parish and Olaine town the administrative centre being Olaine. The population in 2020 was 119,667.

After the 2021 administrative reform, a part of Ķekava Parish of Ķekava Municipality (near the village of Jāņupe) was added to connect both of the separated areas of the municipality.

== Twin towns — sister cities ==
Olaine is twinned with:

- Karlskoga, Sweden
- Nowa Sarzyna, Poland
- Ödeshög, Sweden
- Riihimäki, Finland
- Vadstena, Sweden
