= Jelgava Station =

Railway station in Latvia

Jelgava
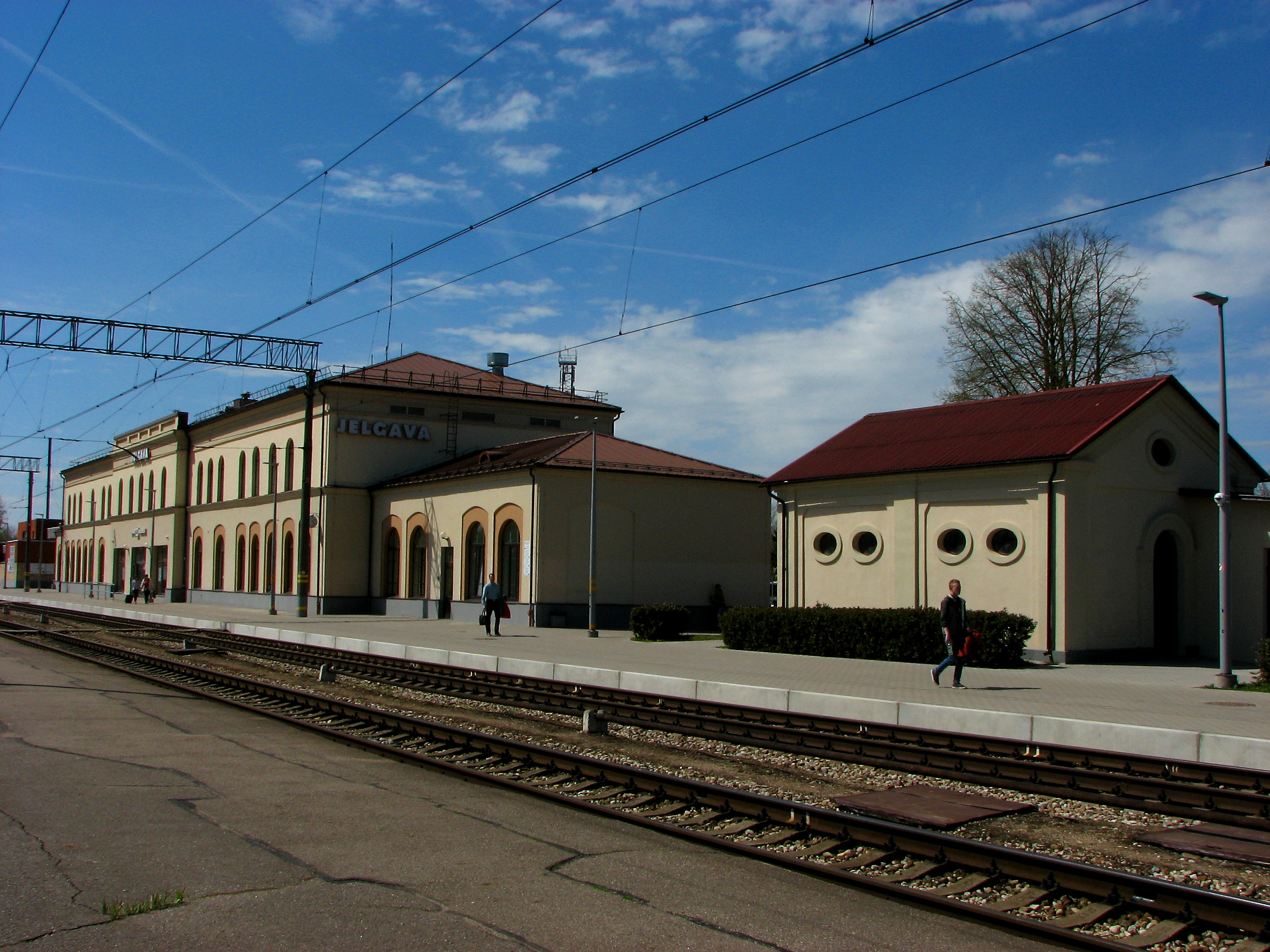

General information
- Location: Stacijas iela 1 Jelgava; Latvia
- Coordinates: 56°38′26.11″N 23°43′55.47″E
- Owner: Latvijas dzelzceļš (LDz)
- Platforms: 3
- Tracks: 27
- Train operators: Vivi; LTG Link

Construction
- Structure type: At-grade
- Architect: Otto Dietze

History
- Opened: 1868
- Former names: Mitau

Services
Preceding station	LDz	Following station
Terminus	Riga–Jelgava	Cukurfabrika towards Riga
Līvbērze towards Tukums II	Tukums II – Jelgava	Terminus
Terminus	Jelgava–Liepāja	Dobele towards Liepāja
Preceding station	LTG Link	Following station
Joniškis (in Lithuania) towards Vilnius	Vilnius—Riga	Riga, Latvia Terminus
Location

Jelgava Station is the main railway station serving the city of Jelgava in the Semigallia region of southern Latvia. The station is located in the central part of the city, on the southeastern edge of the historic town centre, and a short distance west of the Lielupe River.

Jelgava station is an important railway junction where the Riga – Jelgava, Jelgava – Liepāja, Jelgava – Meitene, Tukums II – Jelgava and Jelgava – Krustpils railways all meet. The station is an important rail freight station, which handles around 60 freight trains per day. Passenger trains depart in the direction of Riga.

The station opened in 1868 with the opening of the Riga–Jelgava railway line. The original station building from 1870 designed by the architect Otto Dietze has survived to this day, although it was severely damaged during both world wars.

== Gallery ==
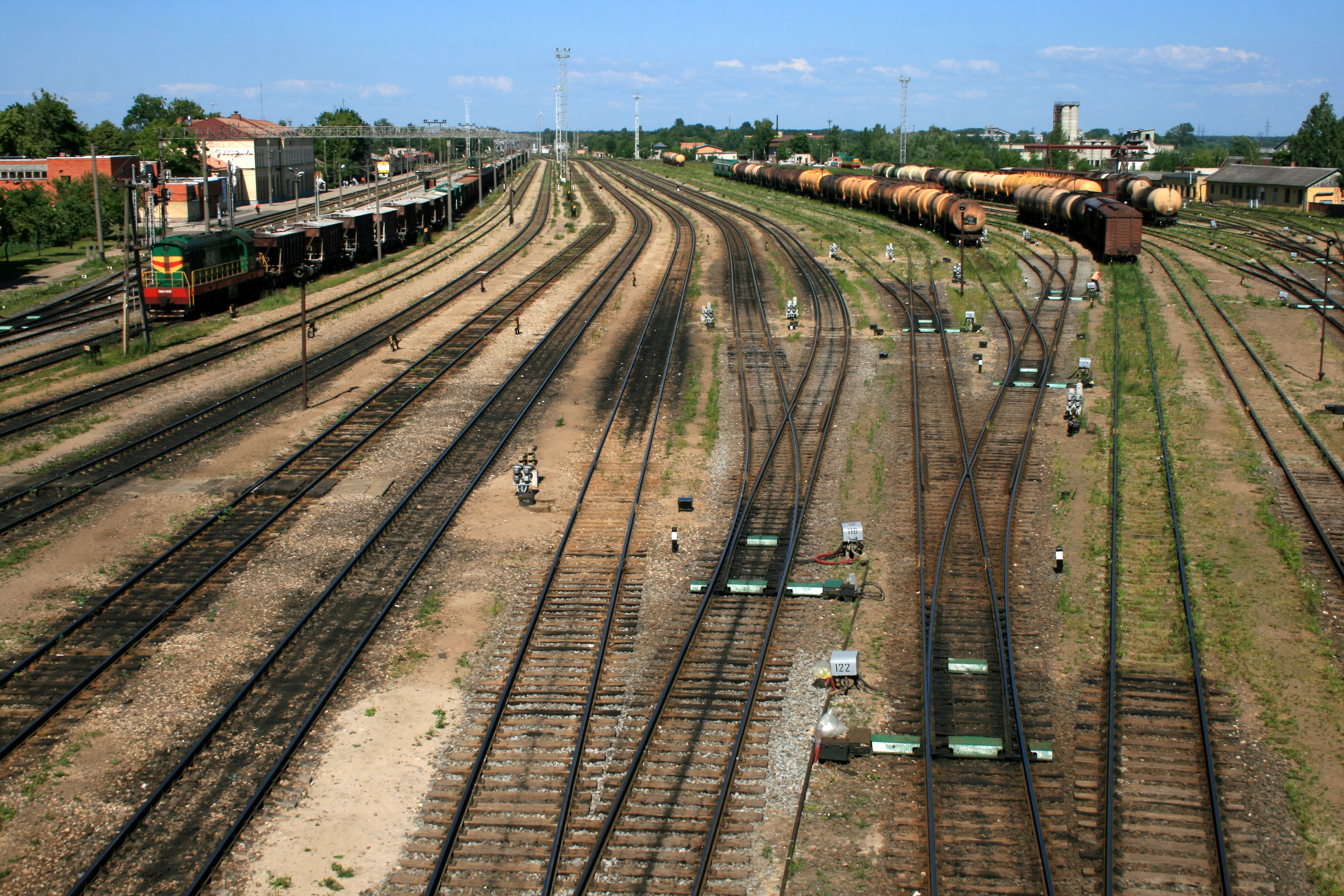
View of the railway yard

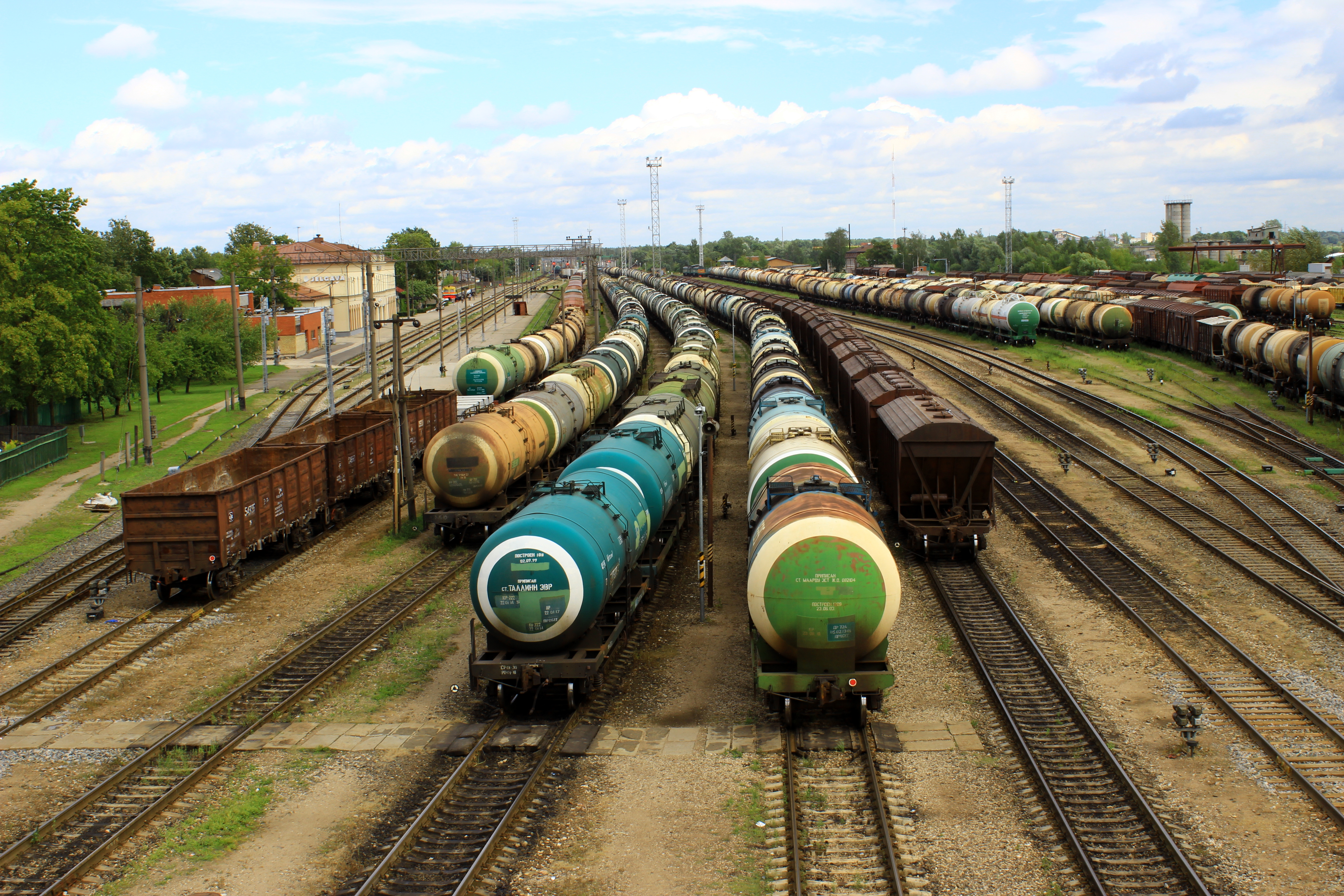
View of the railway yard

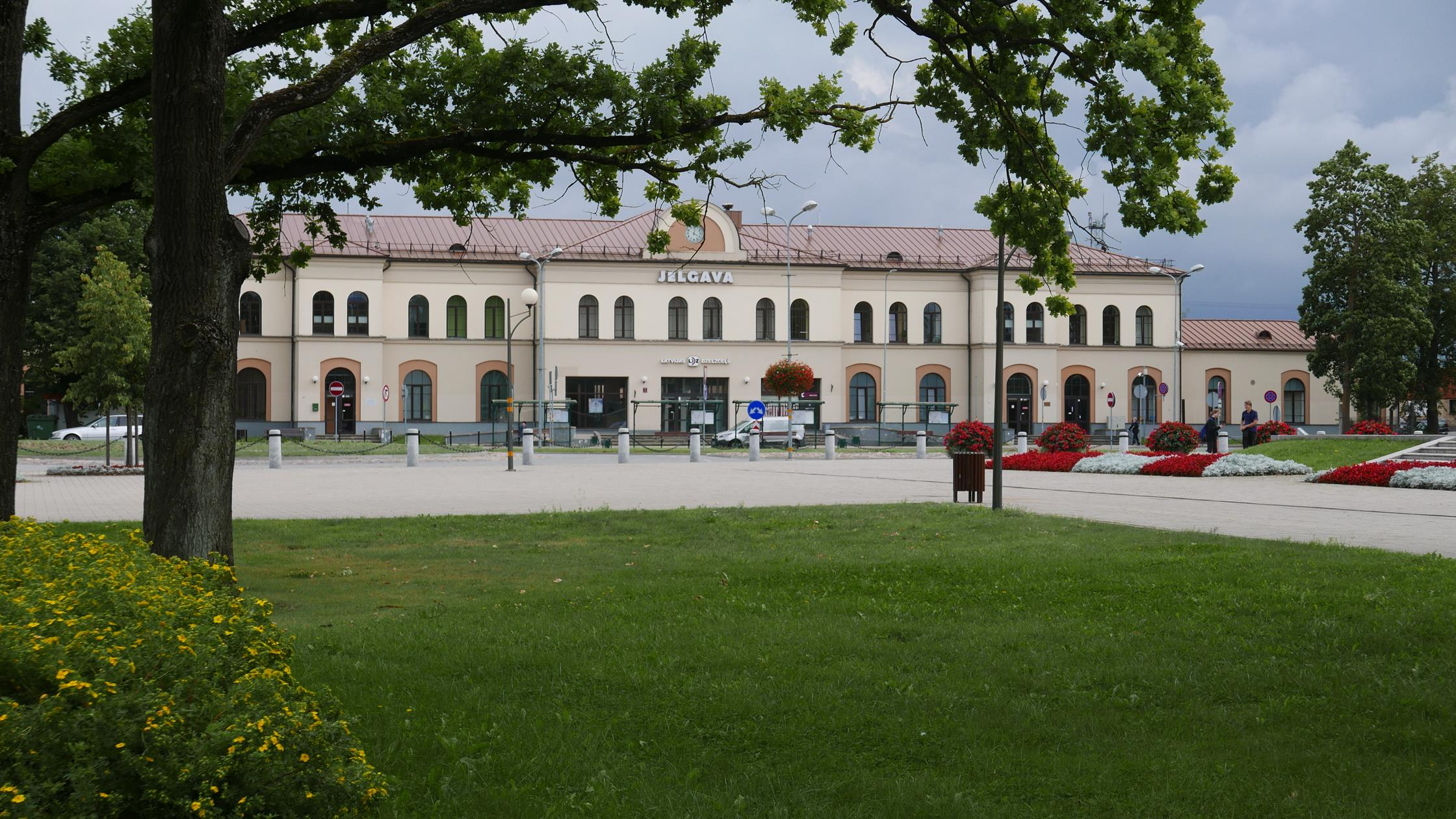
Street facade of the station building

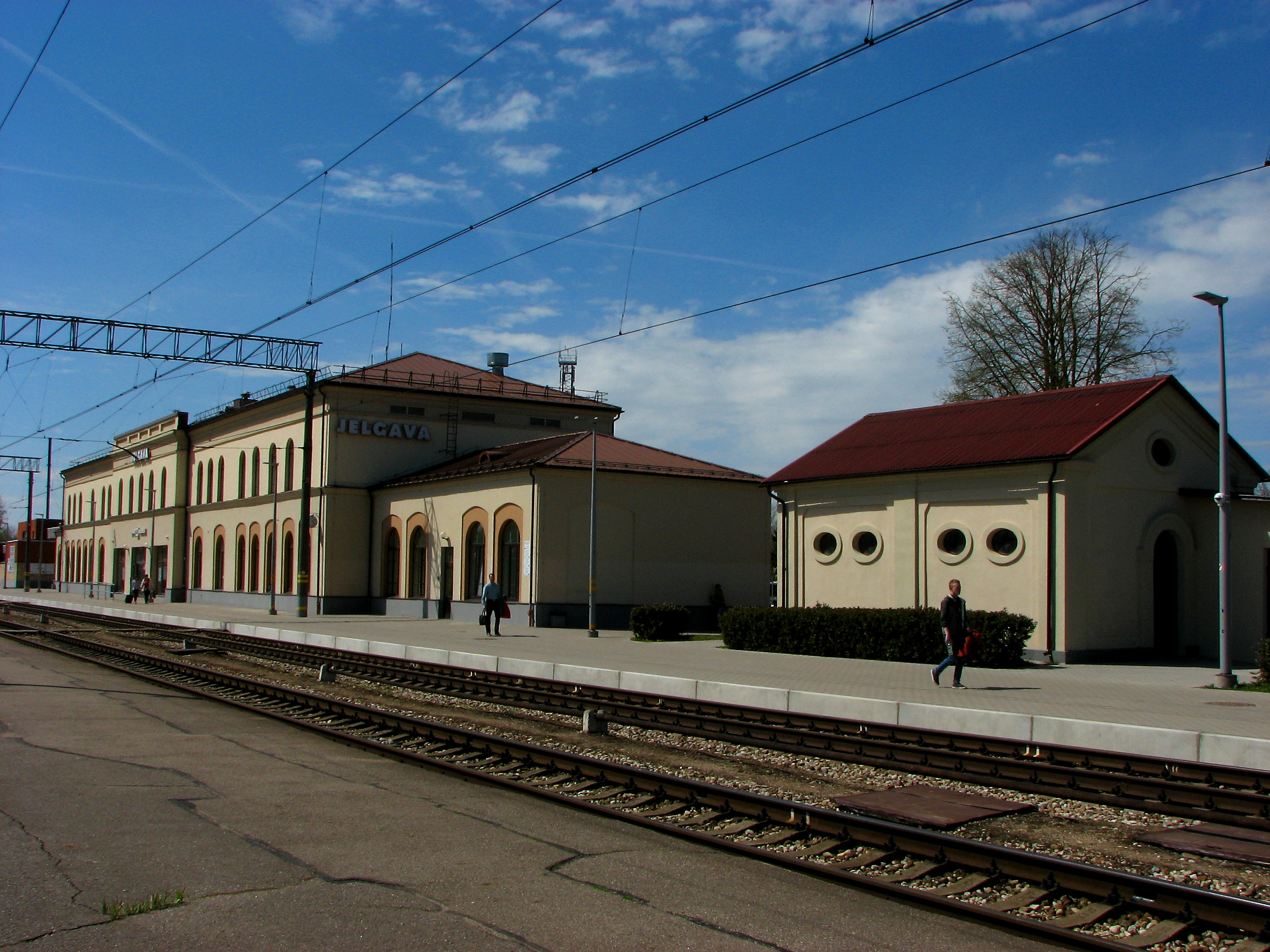
Platform facade of the station building

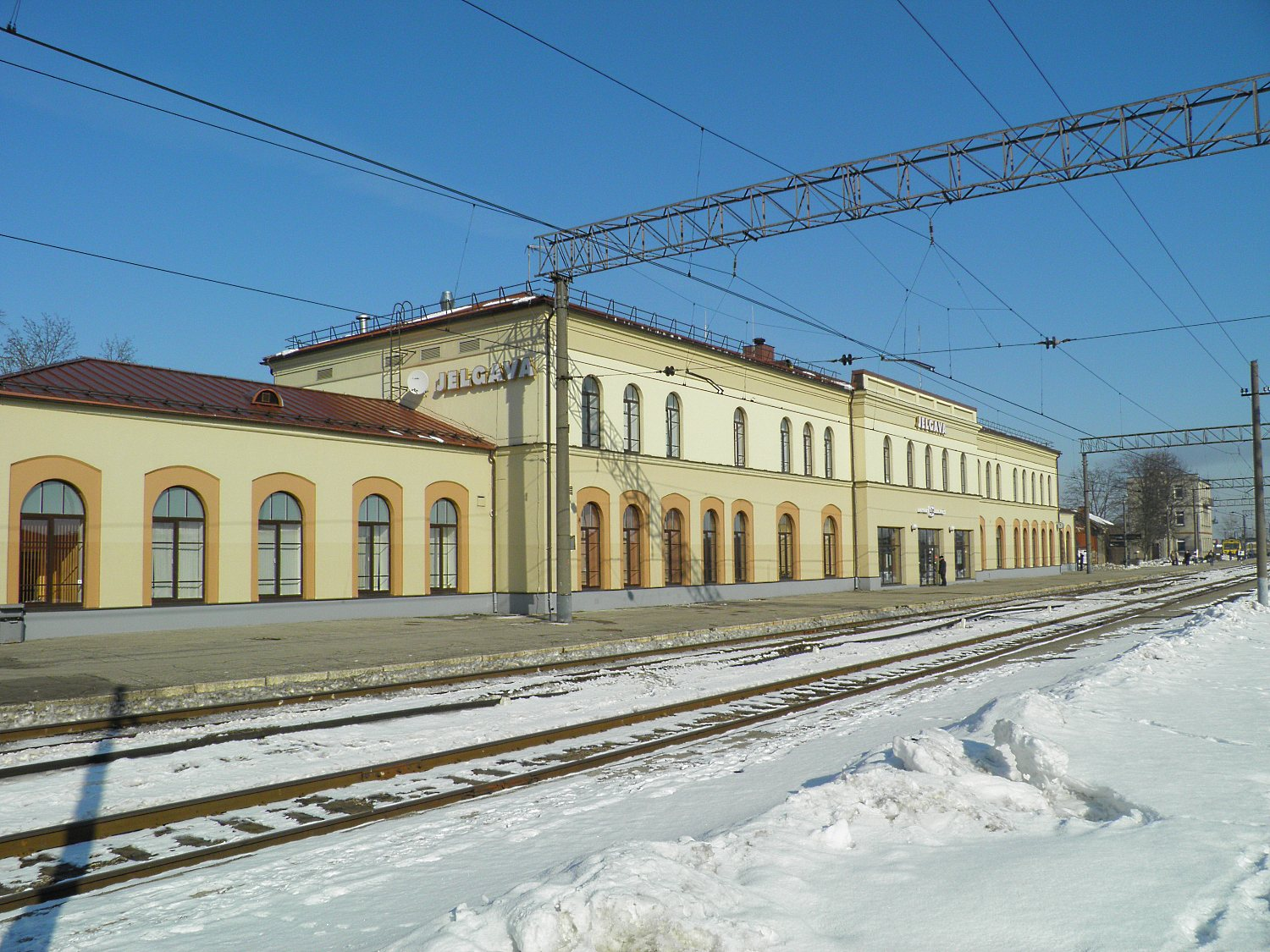
Platform facade of the station building

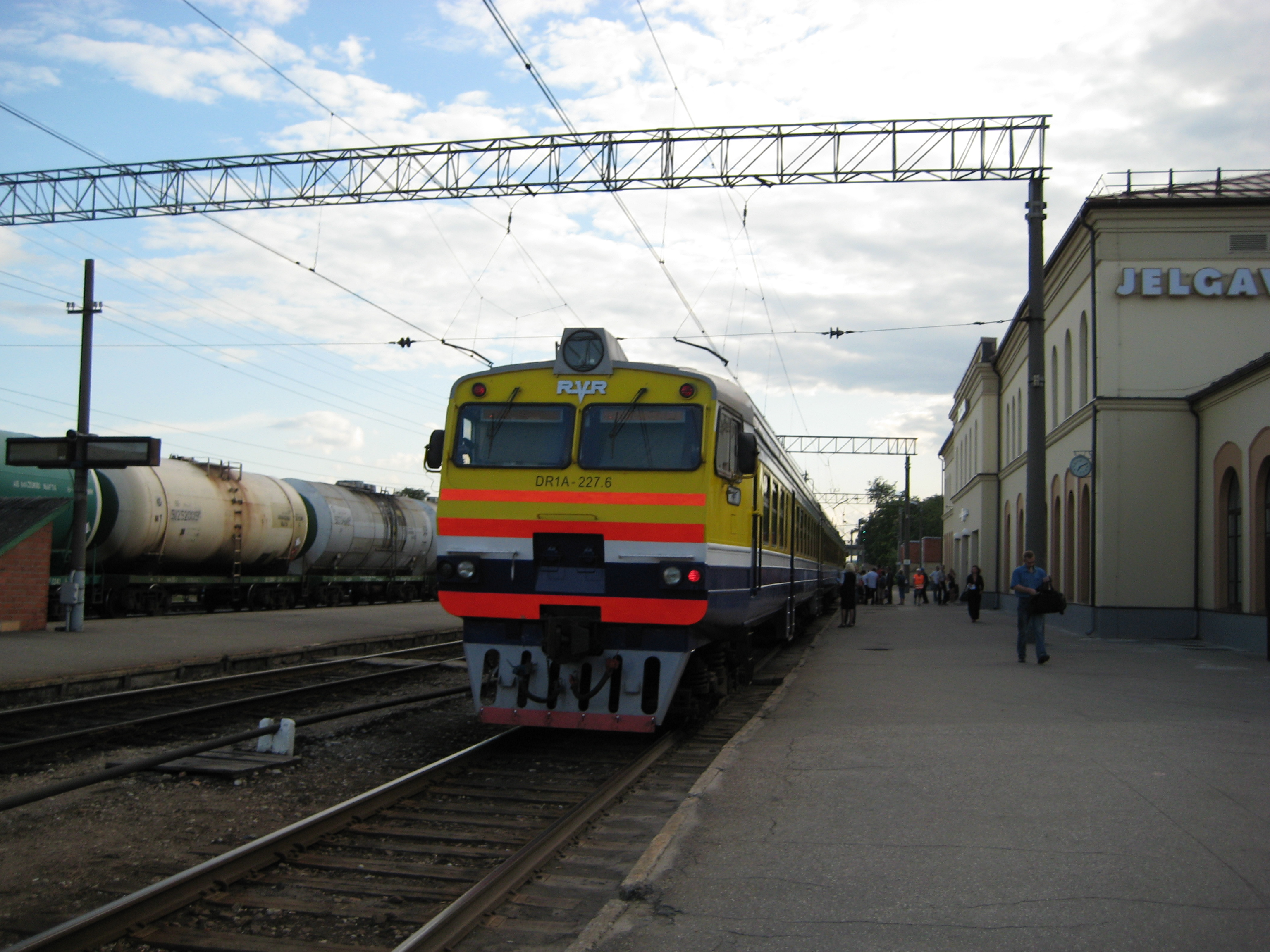
Train at Jelgava station

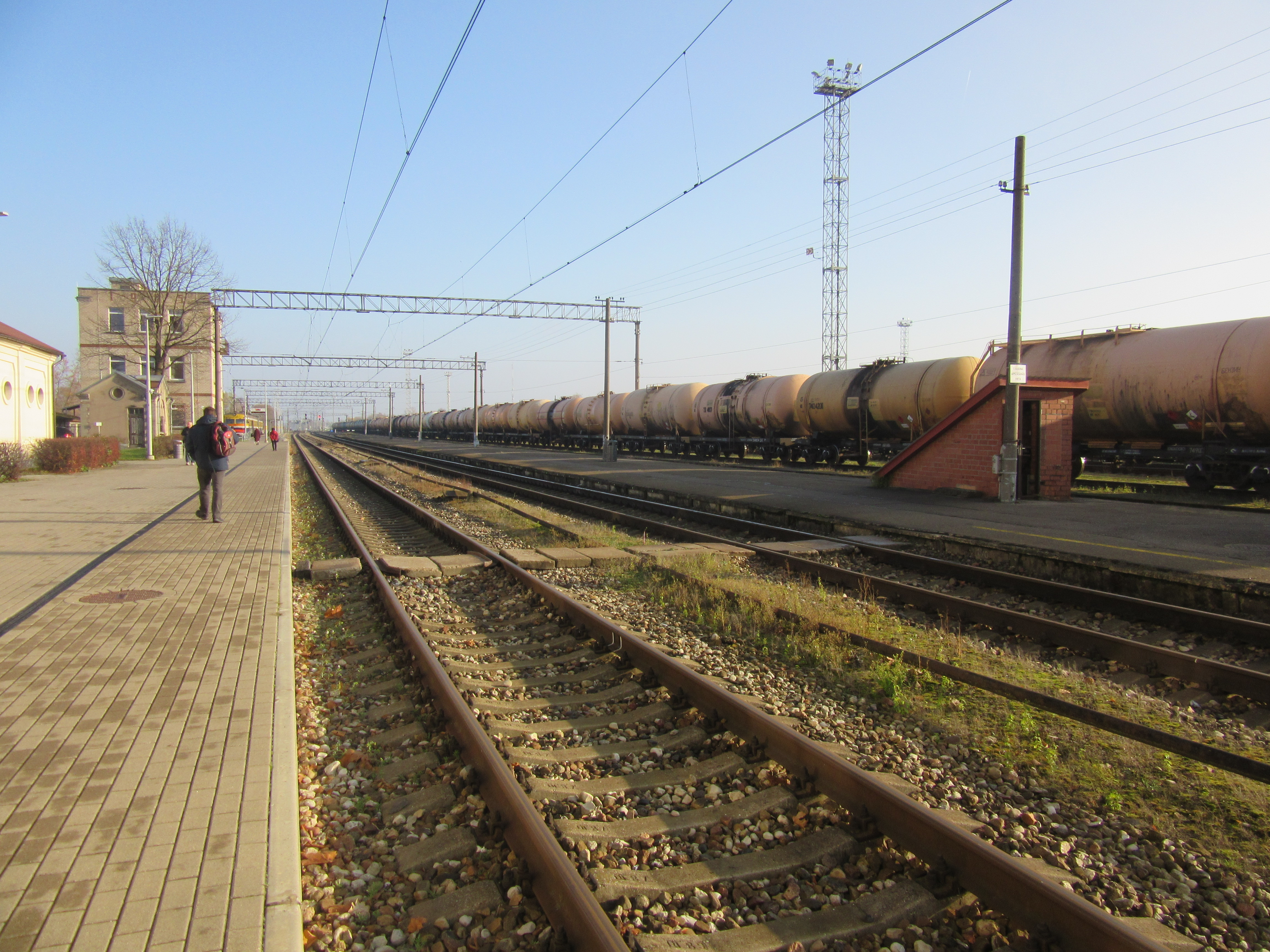
Tracks in the direction of Riga and Krustpils

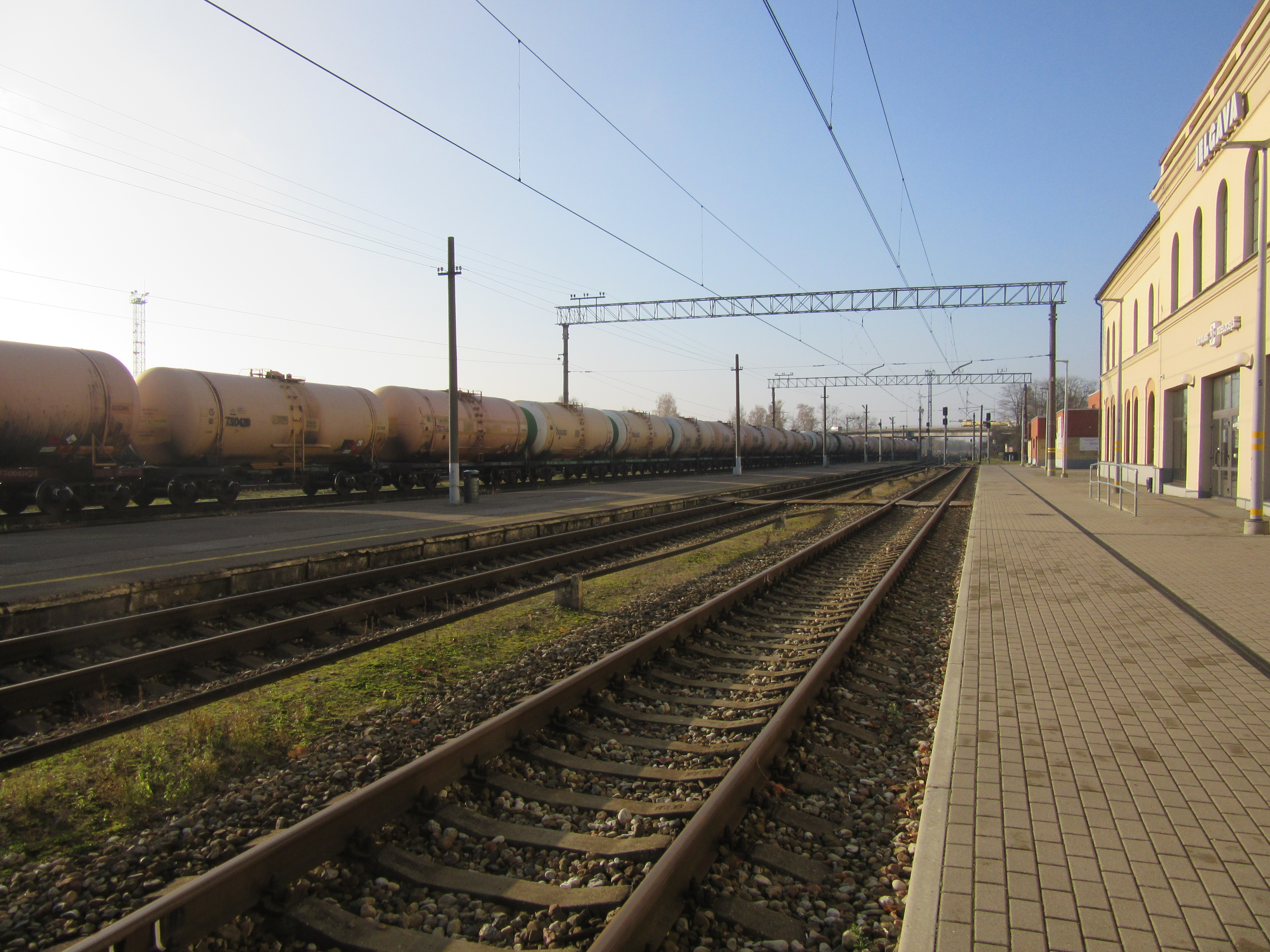
Tracks in the direction of Liepāja and Tukums

== See also ==
- Transport in Latvia
- Rail transport in Latvia
- History of rail transport in Latvia
