= Riga–Jelgava Railway =

Railway in Latvia

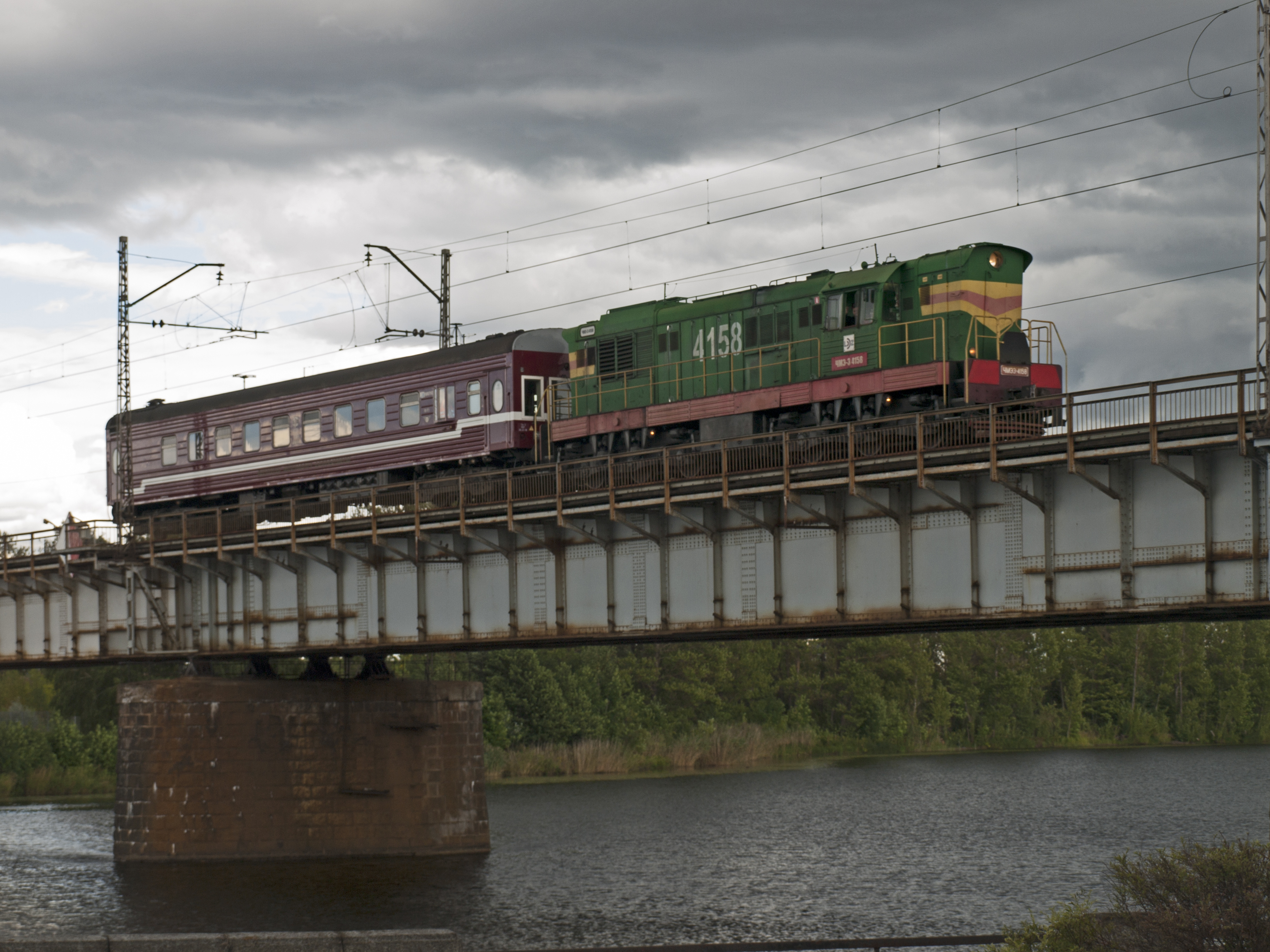
- Train on the railway bridge over the Maza Daugava, Riga

Overview
- Termini: Riga Central Station; Jelgava Station

Service
- Operator: Latvian Railways

History
- Opened: 1868

Technical
- Line length: 43 km (26.72 mi)
- Track gauge: 1,520 mm (4 ft 11 27/32 in) Russian gauge

The Riga–Jelgava Railway is a 43-kilometre-long (27 mi), 1,520 mm (4 ft 11 27/32 in) gauge railway built in the 19th century to connect the cities of Riga and Jelgava. In 1872, an extension was built from Jelgava to Mažeikiai, which connected Riga–Jelgava Railway to the Libava–Romny Railway.

== See also ==
Railway lines in Latvia in 2016.

- Rail transport in Latvia
- History of rail transport in Latvia

== Bibliography ==
- Altbergs, T.; Augustāne, K.; Pētersone, I. (2009). Dzelzceļi Latvijā [Railways in Latvia] (in Latvian). Jumava. ISBN 978-9984-38-698-0.
