= Grīva railway station =

Railway station in Latvia

Grīva Station
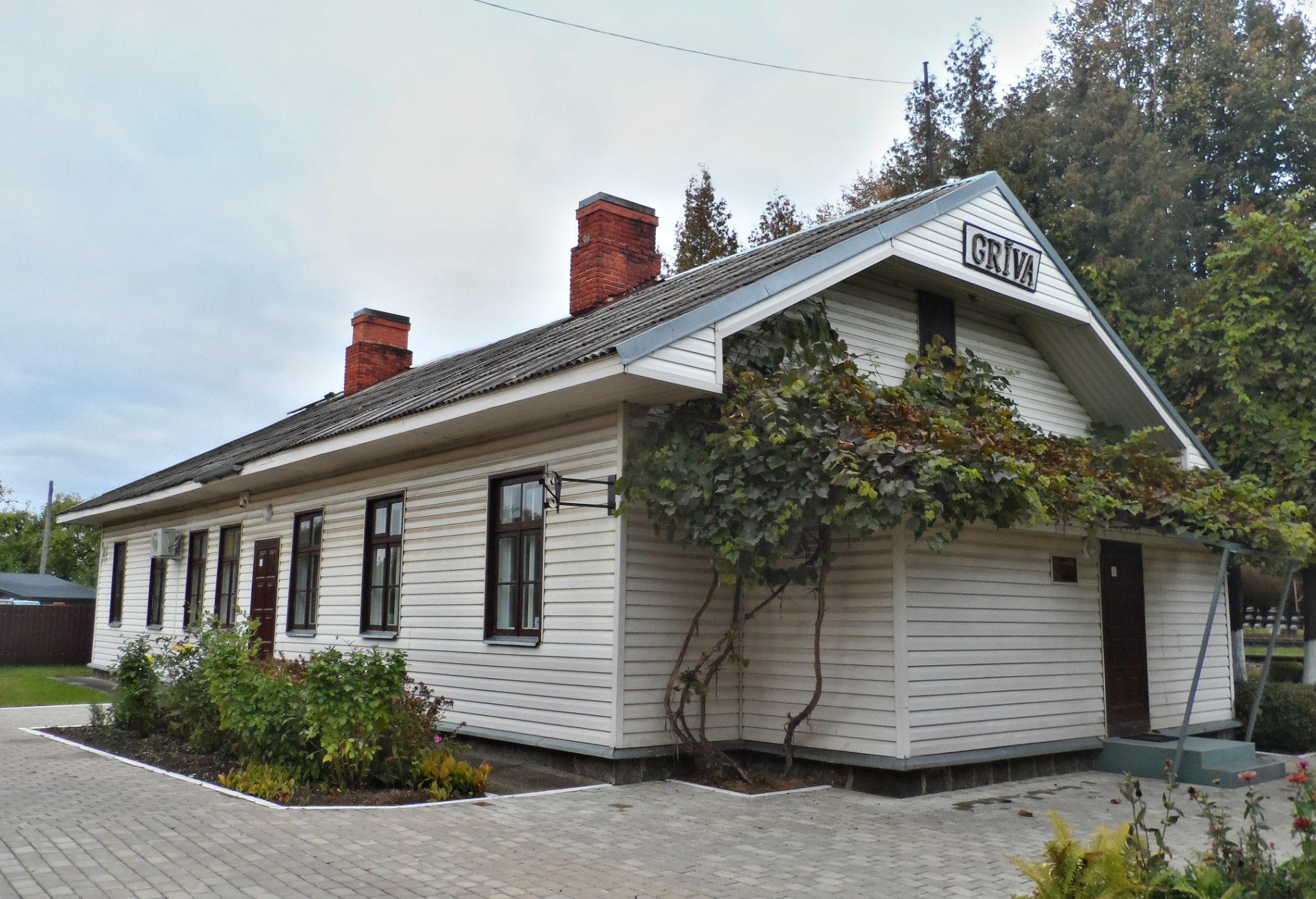
- Grīva Station in 2013

General information
- Location: Birķeneļu iela 39, Daugavpils; Latvia
- Coordinates: 55°51′10.1″N 26°29′20.2″E
- Line: Daugavpils–Kurcums

History
- Opened: 1862
- Former names: Kalkūni railway station
Location
- Location within Latvia railways

Grīva railway station (Latvian: Grīva stacijas) is a railway station by the village of Kalkūni near the city of Daugavpils in southeastern Latvia. The station is situated in the southwestern outskirts of the city on the left bank of the river Daugava.

Grīva railway station is located on the Daugavpils–Kurcums railway line between Daugavpils and Latvia's border with Lithuania. The station opened in 1862 together with that section of the Saint Petersburg–Warsaw Railway. Originally known as Kalkūni railway station, the station was the historical eastern terminus of the Radviliškis–Daugavpils Railway, although that line no longer passes by the station.

== History ==
Originally called Kalkūni railway station, the station opened as one of the original intermediate stations on that section of the Saint Petersburg–Warsaw Railway which opened in 1862. In 1873, the station became a railway junction at the opening of the Radviliškis–Daugavpils Railway which branched of from the Saint Petersburg–Warsaw Railway at the station towards Radviliškis (today, the line no longer passes by Grīva station, but the station still has a direct track connection to it).

During the Polish–Lithuanian War, fights erupted along the railway stations Kalkūni and Turmantas. In 1922, the station was renamed Grīva.

== Gallery ==
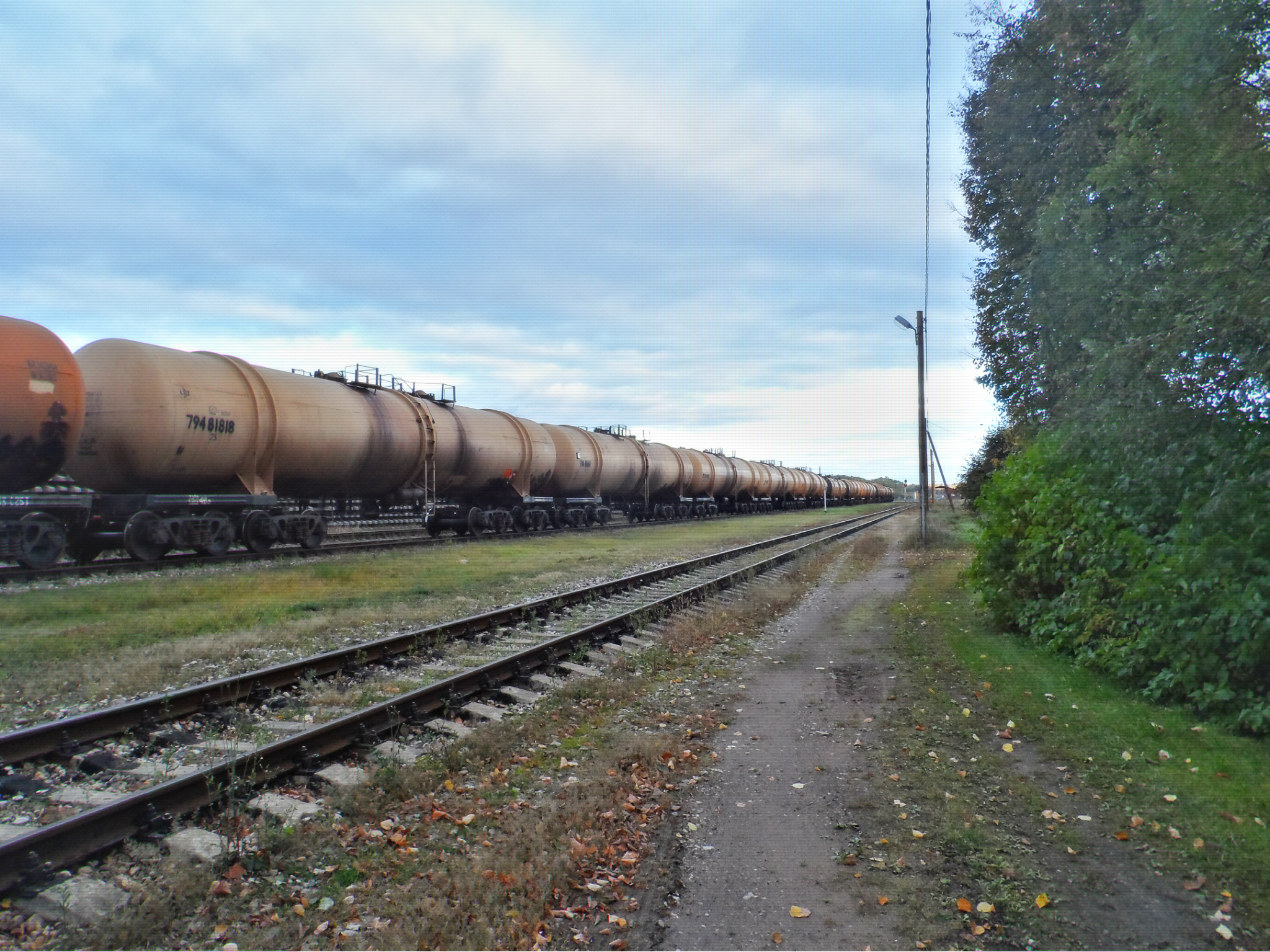
Freight train at Grīva railway station in 2013

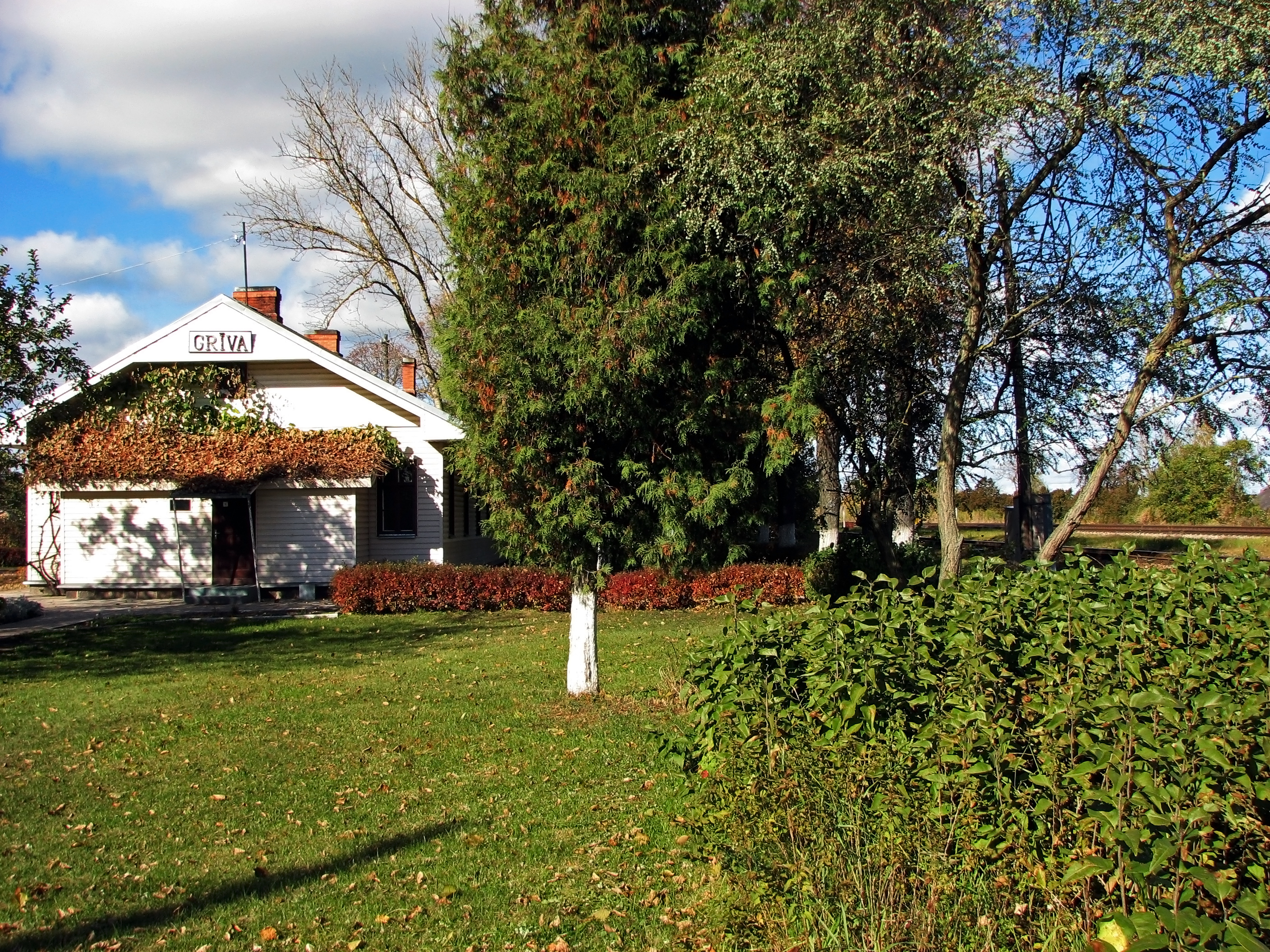
The station building in 2012

== Bibliography ==
- Altbergs, Toms; Augustāne, Karina; Pētersone, Ieva (2009). Dzelzceļi Latvijā [Railways in Latvia] (in Latvian). Jumava. ISBN 978-9984-38-698-0.
