= Jaunogre Station =

Railway station in Latvia

Jaunogre
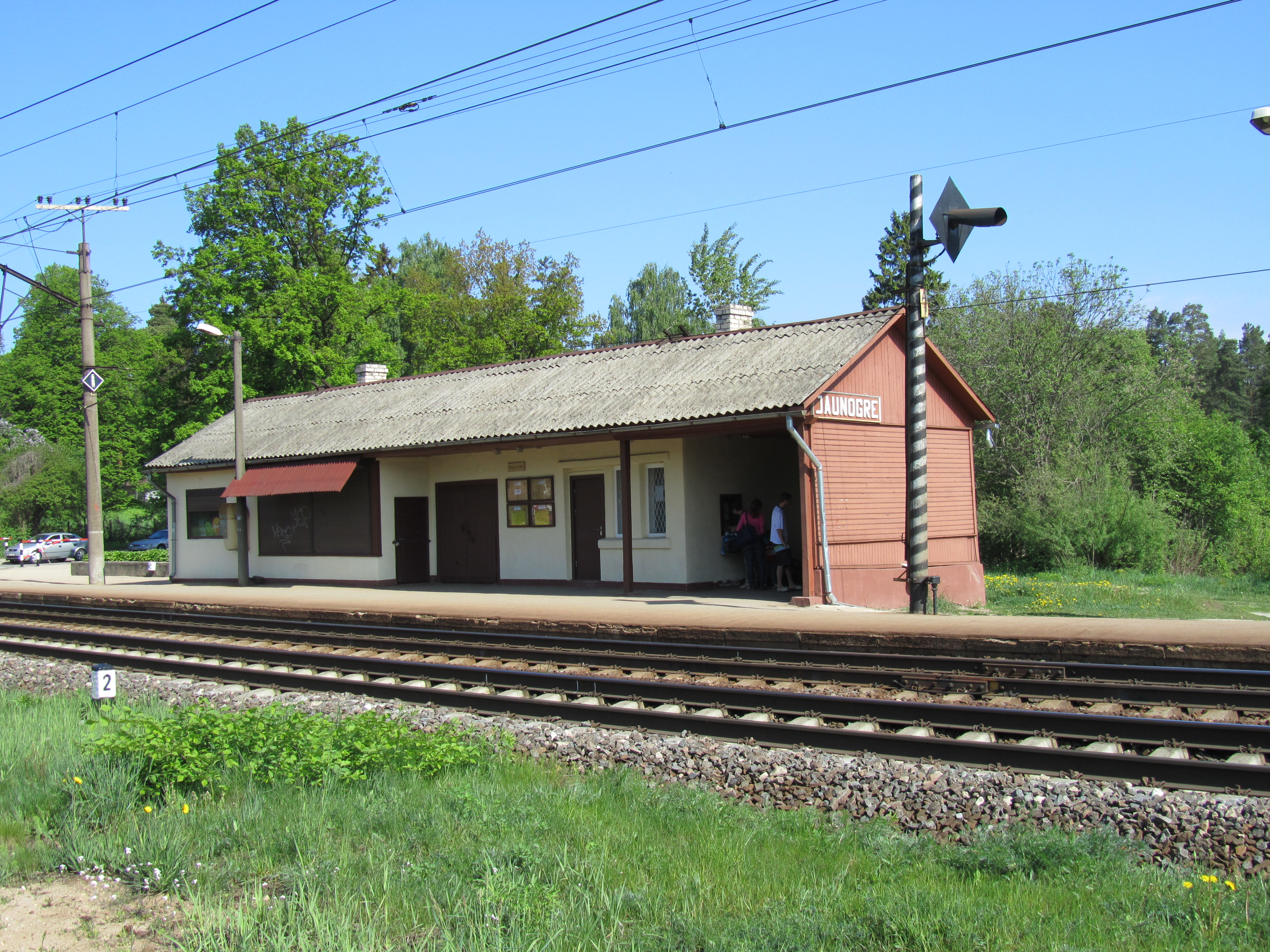

General information
- Location: Ogre, Latvia, Ogre Municipality
- Coordinates: 56°49′20.23″N 24°34′53.61″E
- Platforms: 2
- Tracks: 2

History
- Opened: 1928
- Former names: Ogre II

Services
| Preceding station | LDz | Following station |
|---|---|---|
| Ikšķile towards Riga | Riga–Daugavpils | Ogre towards Daugavpils |
Location
- Location within Latvia railways

Jaunogre Station is a railway station on the Riga–Daugavpils Railway in Latvia.
