= Jumprava Station =

Railway station in Latvia

Jumprava
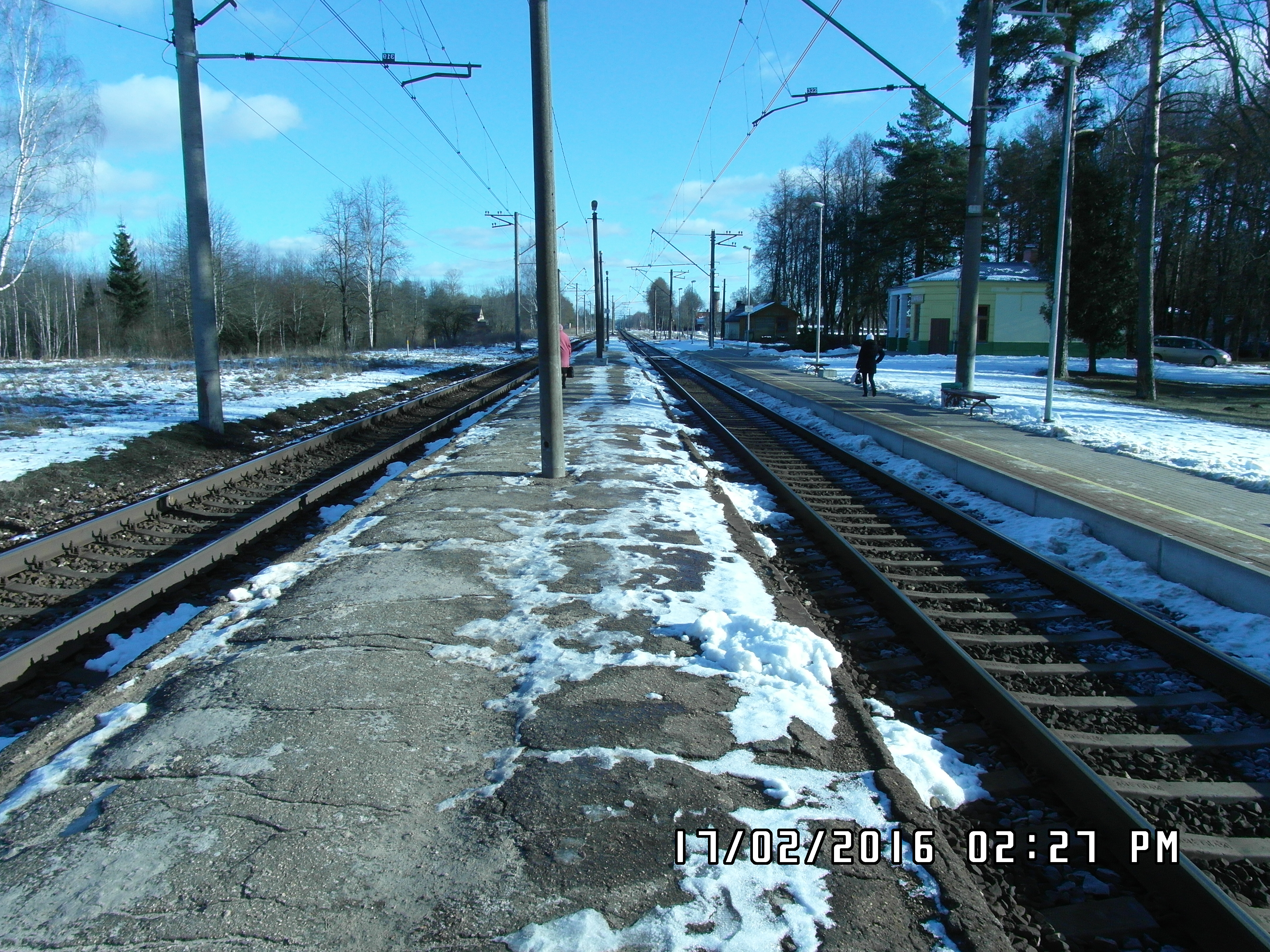

General information
- Location: Jumprava Parish, Ogre Municipality
- Coordinates: 56°40′42.54″N 24°58′26.76″E
- Platforms: 2
- Tracks: 2

History
- Opened: 1918
- Former names: Lomaņi

Services
Preceding station	LDz	Following station
Kaibala towards Riga	Riga–Daugavpils	Skrīveri towards Daugavpils
Location
- Location within Latvia railways

Jumprava Station is a railway station on the Riga–Daugavpils Railway.
