= Kaibala Station =

Railway station in Latvia

Kaibala

General information
- Coordinates: 56°42′12.01″N 24°53′18.41″E
- Line: Riga–Daugavpils Railway

Services
Preceding station	LDz	Following station
Lielvārde towards Riga	Riga–Daugavpils	Jumprava towards Daugavpils
Location
- Location within Latvia railways

Kaibala Station is a railway station on the Riga–Daugavpils Railway.
