= Ciemupe Station =

Railway station in Latvia

Ciemupe
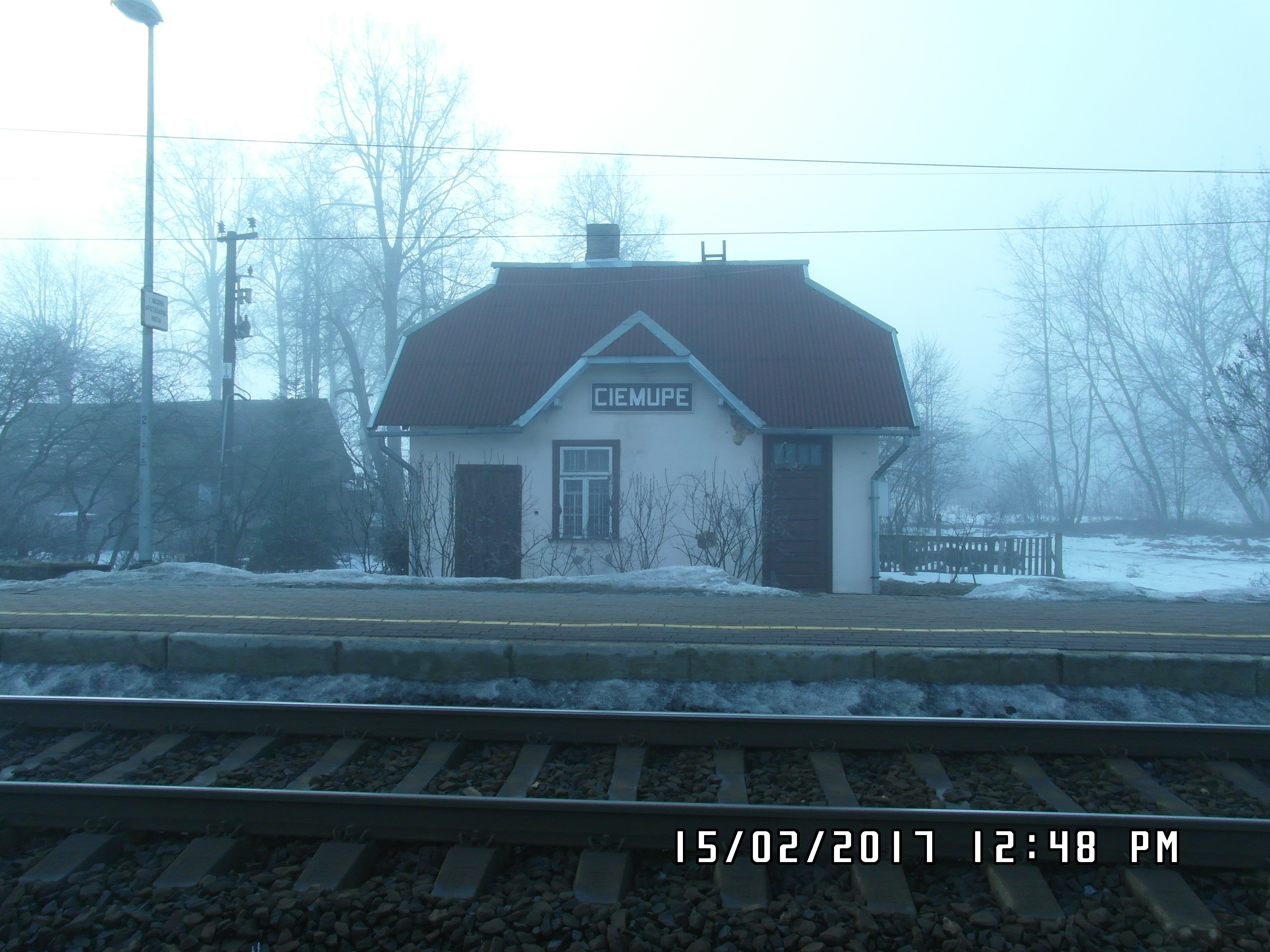
- Former ticket office in Ciemupe.

General information
- Coordinates: 56°46′56″N 24°39′13″E
- Line: Riga–Daugavpils Railway
- Platforms: 2
- Tracks: 2

History
- Opened: 1929

Services
Preceding station	LDz	Following station
Pārogre towards Riga	Riga–Daugavpils	Ķegums towards Daugavpils
Location
- Location within Latvia railways

Ciemupe Station is a railway station on the Riga–Daugavpils Railway.
