= Lielvārde Station =

Train station in Latvia

Lielvārde
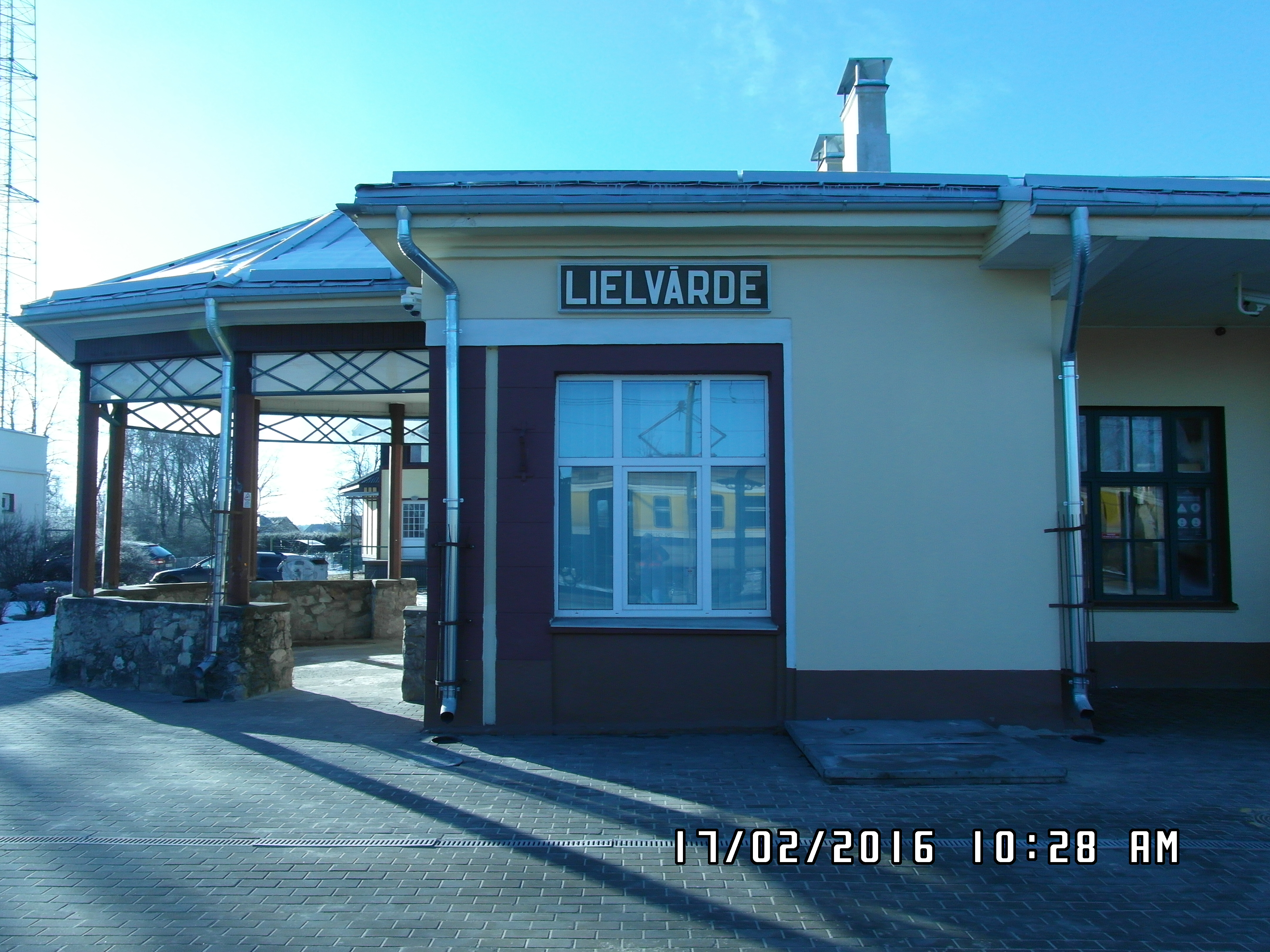

General information
- Location: Ausekļa iela 1, Lielvārde, Ogre Municipality
- Coordinates: 56°43′20.10″N 24°48′27.13″E
- Line: Riga–Daugavpils Railway
- Platforms: 2
- Tracks: 4

History
- Opened: 1861
- Former names: Ringmundhof, Rembate

Services
Preceding station	LDz	Following station
Ķegums towards Riga	Riga–Daugavpils	Kaibala towards Daugavpils
Location
- Location within Latvia railways

Lielvārde Station (until 1926, Rembate) is a railway station on the Riga–Daugavpils Railway in Latvia. It is located in Vidzeme in Lielvarde, the Lielvārde Municipality center.

All but two Riga - Daugavpils - Riga trains stop here, as well as all Riga - Zilupe trains, one Zilupe - Riga train, and many suburban services from Riga to Aizkraukle. The route Riga-Lielvarde terminates here, and all trains on the routre Riga - Rezekne II pass the station.

== History ==
The original station was built in 1861 during construction of the Riga–Daugavpils Railway. Originally its name was Ringmundhofa. During the First World War the station was severely damaged, and after the war the building was demolished.

In 1922 a new station building was erected with the name Rembate, as one of the first newly built station buildings in the independent Latvian state.

In 1926, the station was renamed Lielvarde.

The Second World War again brought severe damage to the station. Again station restoration was not possible, and in 1950 a new station building was constructed. This station building has survived to the present day.
