= Gaisma Station =

Railway station in Latvia

Gaisma
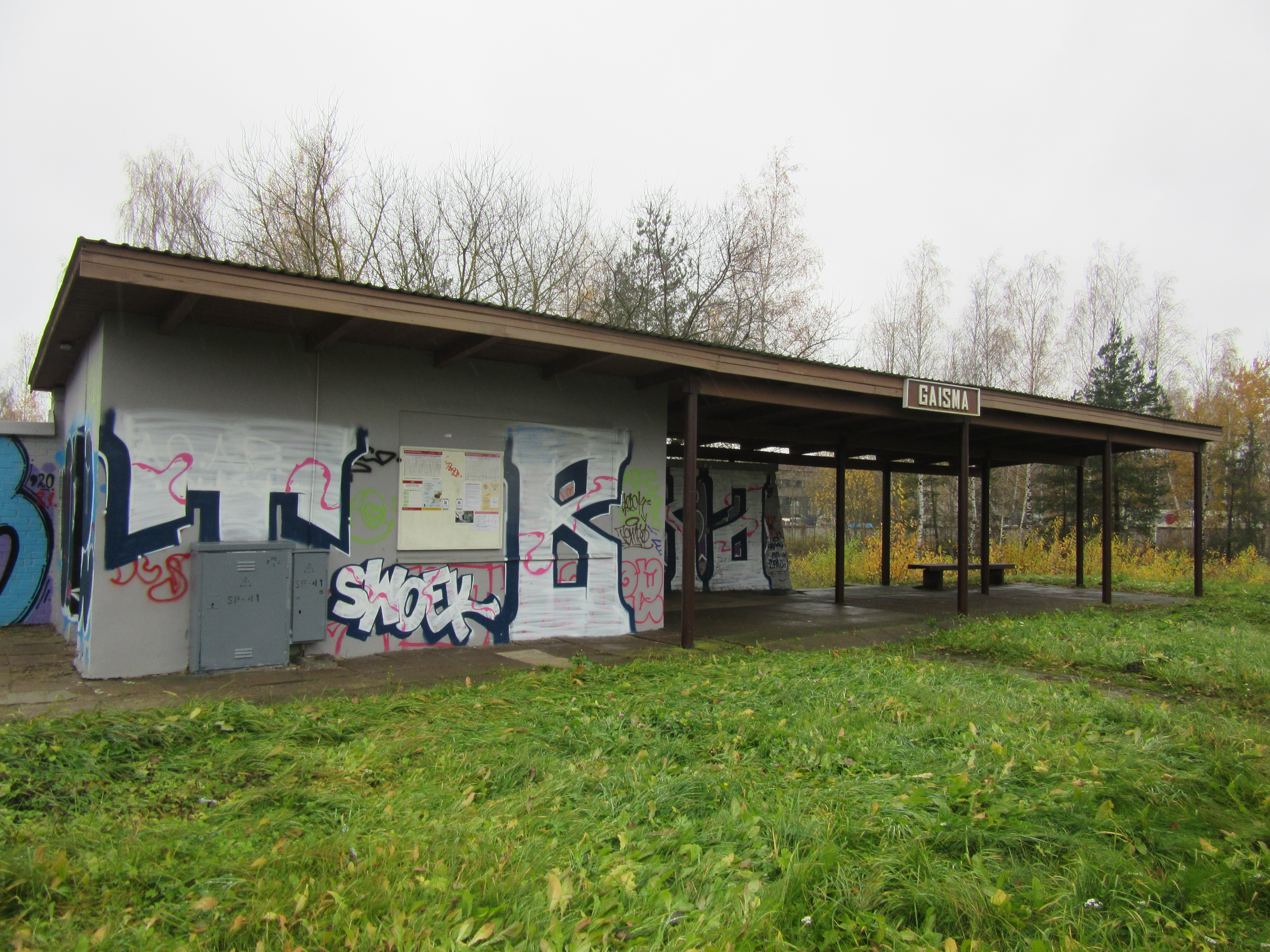
- Gaisma Station in 2021

General information
- Location: Lokomotīves iela 145, Riga; Latvia
- Coordinates: 56°53′39.88″N 24°13′55.39″E
- Platforms: 2
- Tracks: 2

History
- Opened: 1961

Services
Preceding station	LDz	Following station
Šķirotava towards Riga	Riga–Daugavpils	Rumbula towards Daugavpils
Location
- Location within Latvia

Gaisma Station is a railway station on the Riga – Daugavpils Railway.
