= Dārziņi Station =

Railway station in Latvia

Dārziņi
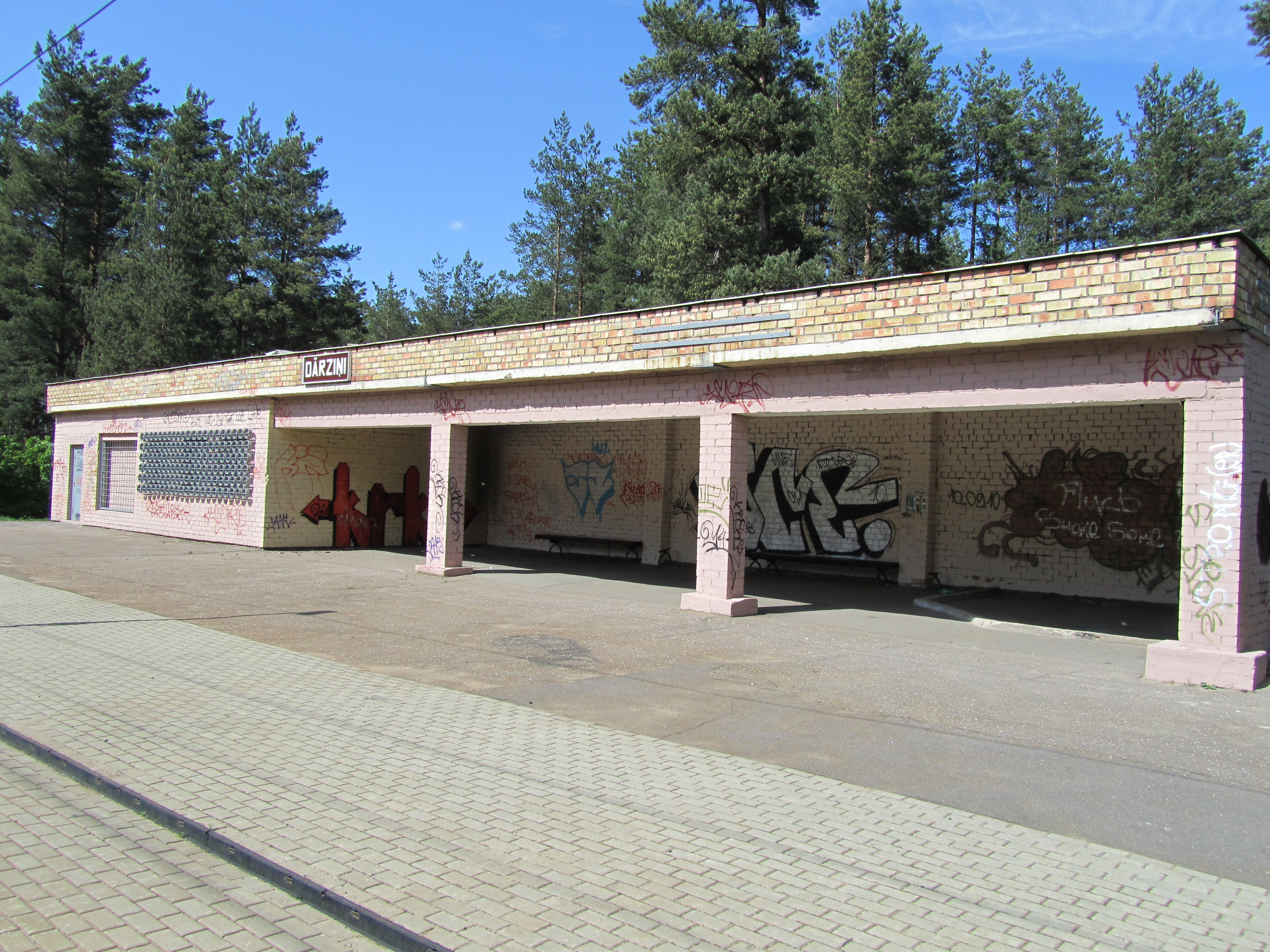

General information
- Location: Salaspils Municipality
- Coordinates: 56°52′12.34″N 24°16′51.68″E
- Line: Riga - Daugavpils
- Platforms: 2
- Tracks: 2

Construction
- Parking: no

History
- Opened: 1960

Services
Preceding station	LDz	Following station
Rumbula towards Riga	Riga–Daugavpils	Dole towards Daugavpils
Location
- Location within Latvia

Dārziņi Station is a railway station on the Riga – Daugavpils Railway.

== History ==
The station was opened in 1960. A route to the Salaspils Memorial Ensemble was marked from the station. In December 2019, the number of passenger train services stopping at Dārziņi was reduced. The closure of Dārziņi station was planned from 2022, but several electric multiple unit services continued to stop there. In August 2023, the Public Transport Council (SAP) decided to close the station by the end of the year, but the decision was subsequently postponed.
