= Ķegums Station =

Railway station in Latvia

Ķegums
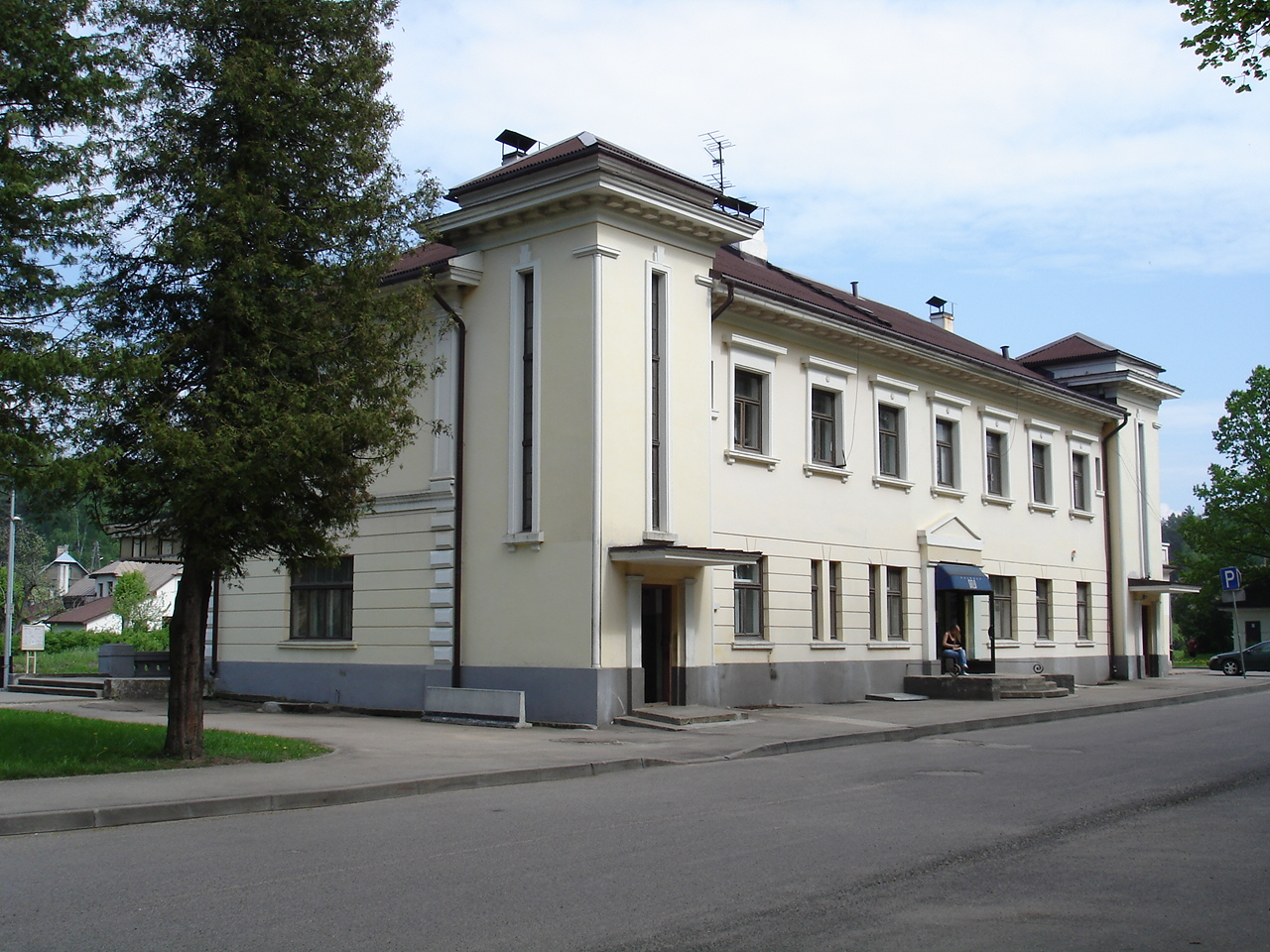
- Station building

General information
- Location: Station Square 1, Ķegums, Ogre Municipality; Latvia
- Coordinates: 56°44′48.64″N 24°43′7″E
- Platforms: 2
- Tracks: 2

History
- Opened: 1924
- Rebuilt: 1985

Services
Preceding station	LDz	Following station
Ciemupe towards Riga	Riga–Daugavpils	Lielvārde towards Daugavpils
Location
- Location within Latvia railways

Ķegums Station is a railway station on the Riga–Daugavpils Railway.
