= Salaspils Station =

Railway station in Latvia

Salaspils
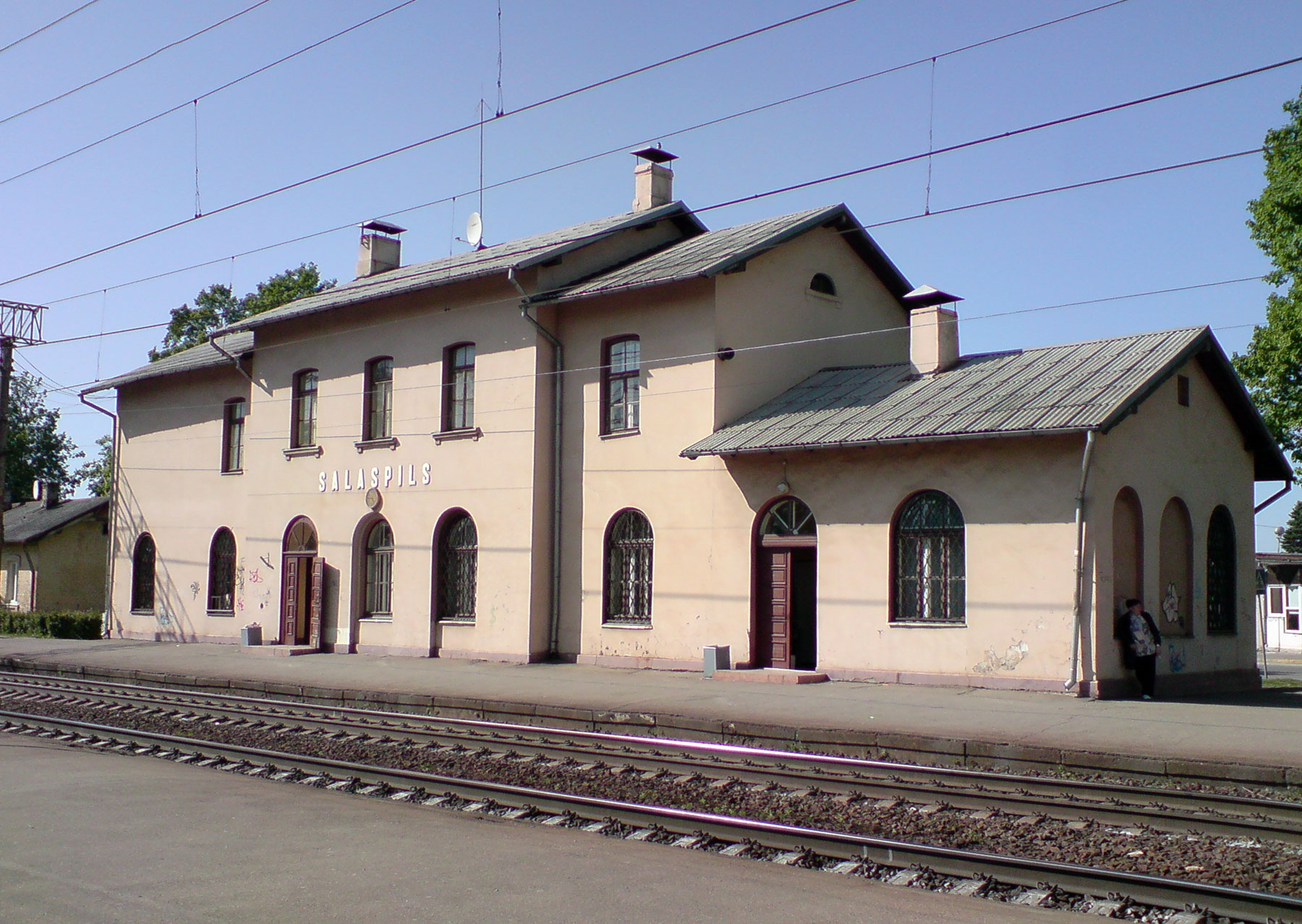

General information
- Location: Salaspils, Salaspils Municipality
- Coordinates: 56°51′38.37″N 24°21′11.25″E
- Platforms: 2
- Tracks: 6

History
- Opened: 1861
- Former names: Kurtenhof, Stopiņi

Services
Preceding station	LDz	Following station
Dole towards Riga	Riga–Daugavpils	Saulkalne towards Daugavpils
Location

Salaspils Station is a railway station on the Riga–Daugavpils Railway. It is situated 18.3 km from Riga and 198.7 km from Daugavpils
