= Ikšķile Station =

Railway station in Latvia

Ikšķile
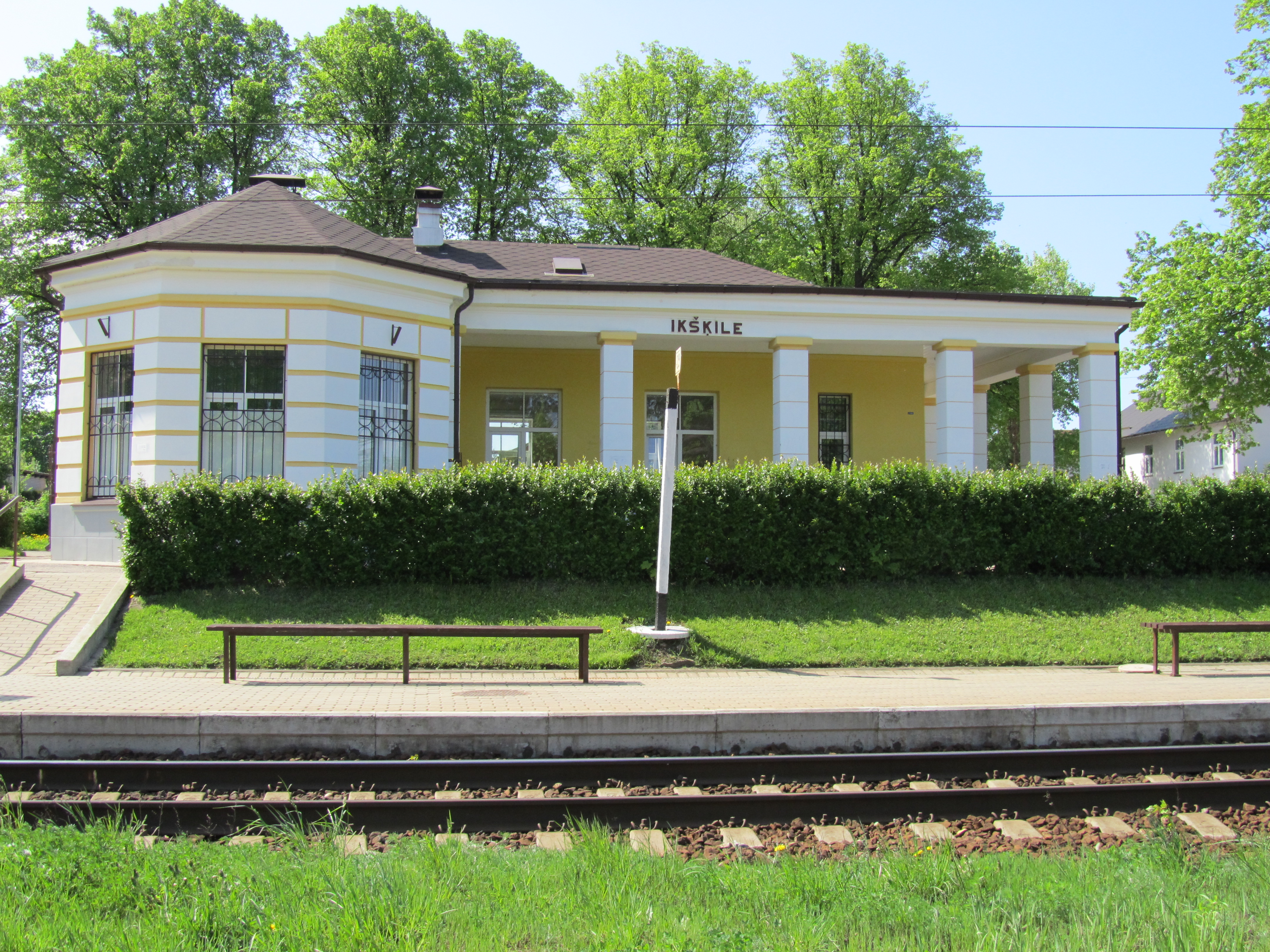

General information
- Location: Ikšķile, Ogre Municipality
- Coordinates: 56°50′22.44″N 24°30′20.87″E
- Platforms: 2
- Tracks: 2

History
- Opened: 1863

Services
Preceding station	LDz	Following station
Saulkalne towards Riga	Riga–Daugavpils	Jaunogre towards Daugavpils
Location
- Location within Latvia railways

Ikšķile Station is a railway station serving the town of Ikšķile in Ogre Municipality in the Vidzeme region of Latvia. The station is located on the Riga–Daugavpils Railway.
