= Dole Station =

Railway station in Salaspils, Latvia

Dole
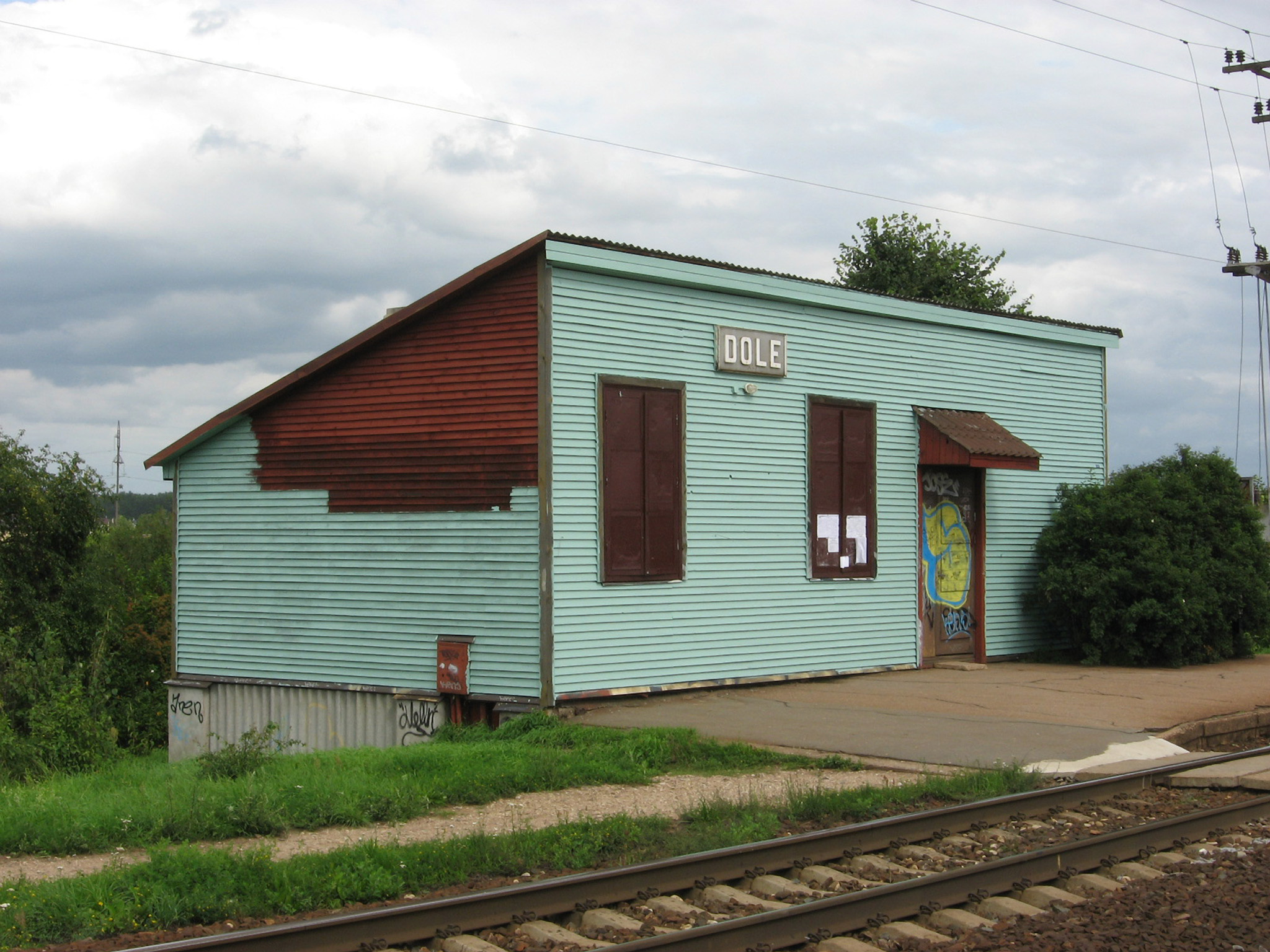

General information
- Location: near Kalnrozes iela 11, Salaspils, Salaspils Municipality
- Coordinates: 56°51′52″N 24°19′27″E

History
- Opened: 1884
- Former names: Petrovskiy lager (Петровский лагерь)

Services
Preceding station	LDz	Following station
Dārziņi towards Riga	Riga–Daugavpils	Salaspils towards Daugavpils
Location

Dole Station is a railway station on the Riga–Daugavpils Railway. It is located in the town limits of Salaspils and named after nearby Dole Island.

It is serviced by all Vivi electric trains within the line and the diesel train en route to Krustpils.

The station first existed as Petrovskiy lager ('Peter's Camp') until World War I and it serviced nearby summer camps of the Russian imperial 29th Infantry Division.
