= Saulkalne Station =

Railway station in Salaspils Parish, Latvia

Saulkalne
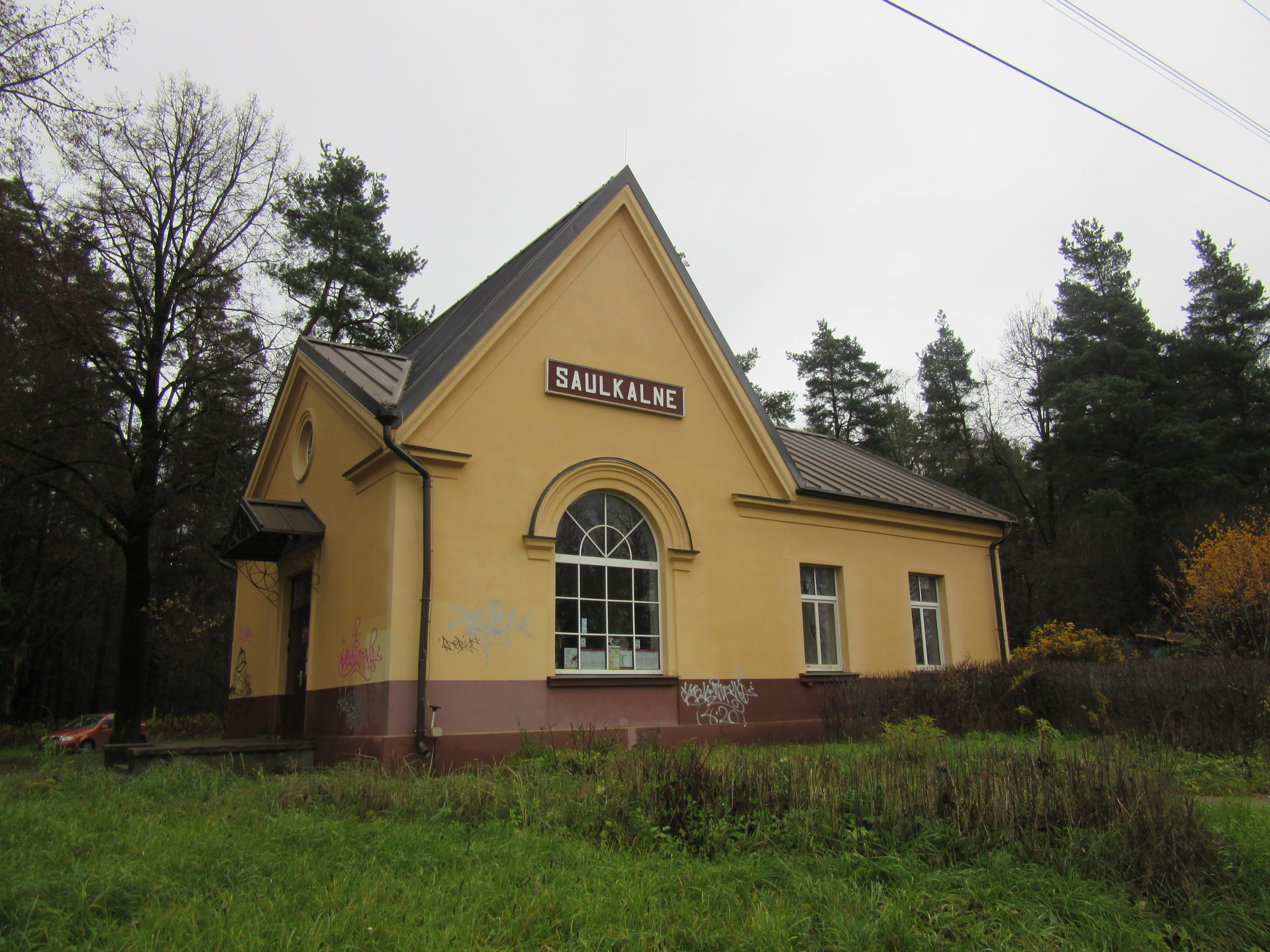

General information
- Location: Saulkalne, Salaspils Municipality
- Coordinates: 56°50′58″N 24°26′13″E
- Platforms: 2
- Tracks: 2

History
- Opened: 1931

Services
Preceding station	LDz	Following station
Salaspils towards Riga	Riga–Daugavpils	Ikšķile towards Daugavpils
Location
- Location within Latvia railways

Saulkalne Station is a railway station on the Riga–Daugavpils Railway.
