= Pārogre Station =

Railway station in Latvia

Parogre
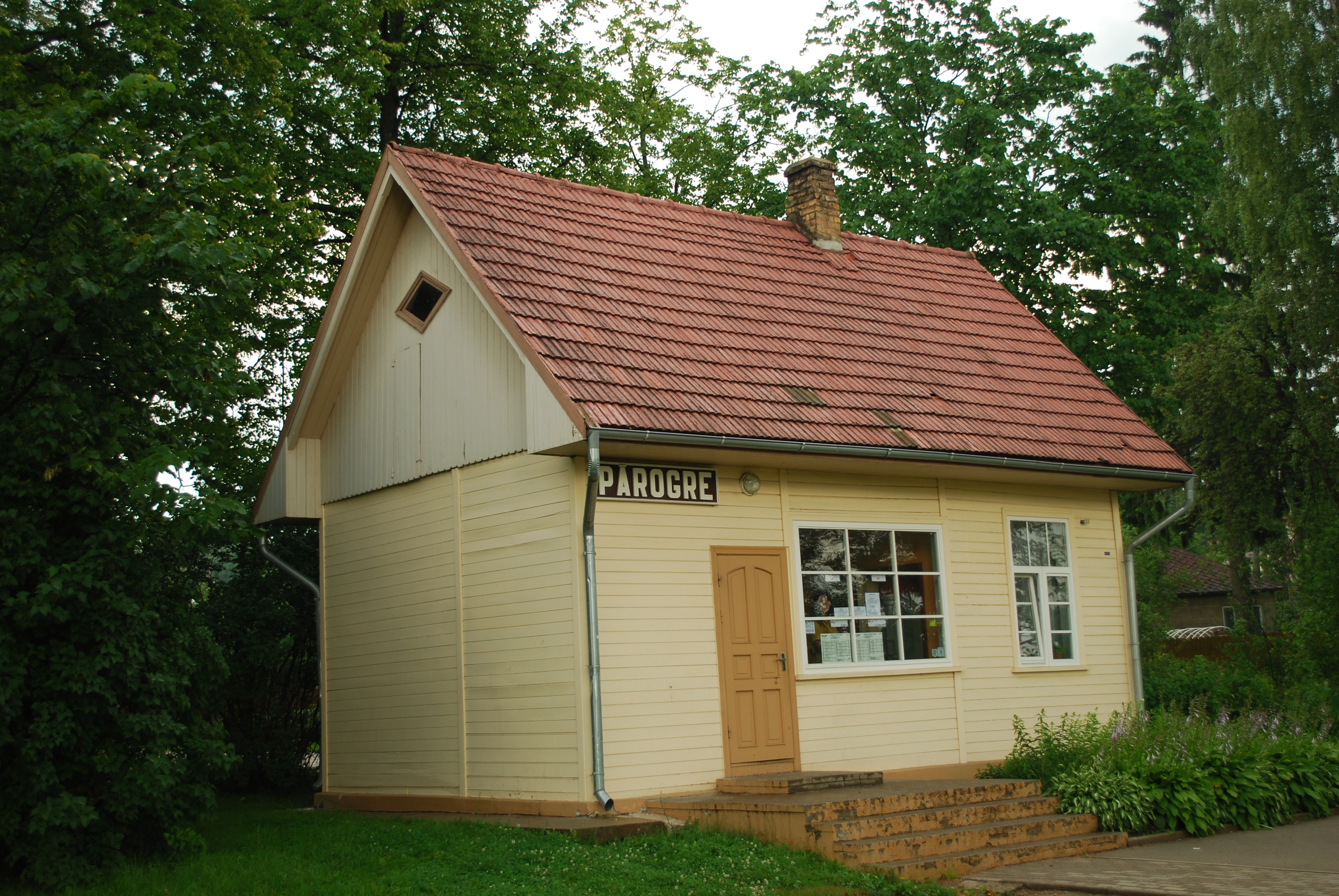

General information
- Coordinates: 56°48′29″N 24°37′01″E
- Platforms: 2
- Tracks: 2

History
- Opened: 1931

Services
Preceding station	LDz	Following station
Ogre towards Riga	Riga–Daugavpils	Ciemupe towards Daugavpils
Location
- Location within Latvia railways

Pārogre Station is a railway station on the Riga–Daugavpils Railway between Ogre and Ciemupe stations. Pārogre is the only railway station in Latvia from which the next station (Ogre) is visible.
