= Ogre Station =

Railway station in Ogre, Latvia

Ogre
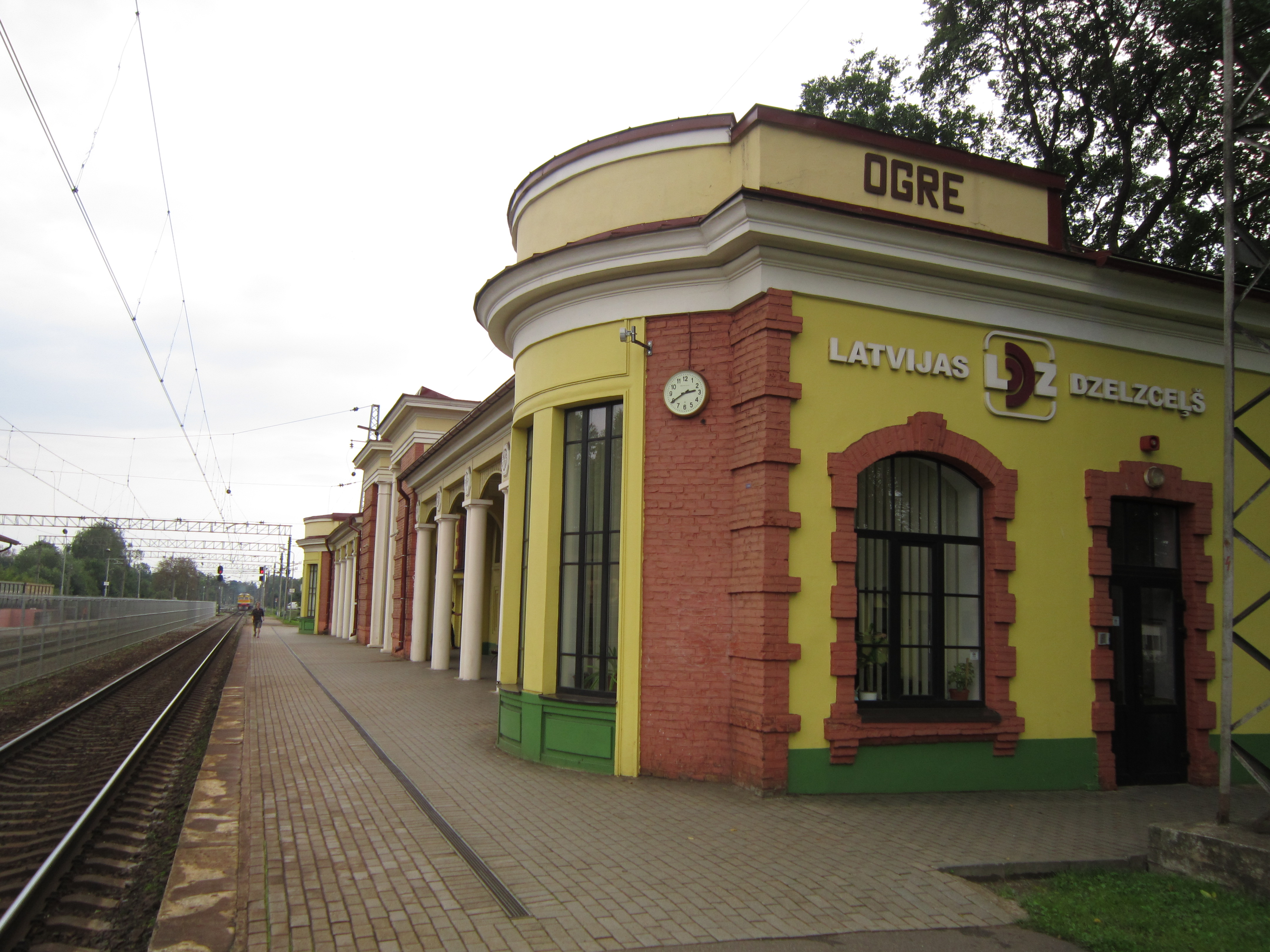

General information
- Location: Skolas iela 1, Ogre, Ogre Municipality
- Coordinates: 56°48′58.86″N 24°36′3.38″E
- Platforms: 2
- Tracks: 7

History
- Opened: 1861
- Former names: Oger

Services
Preceding station	LDz	Following station
Jaunogre towards Riga	Riga–Daugavpils	Pārogre towards Daugavpils
Location
- Location within Latvia railways

Ogre Station is a railway station on the Riga–Daugavpils Railway.
