= Rumbula Station =

Railway station in Latvia

Rumbula
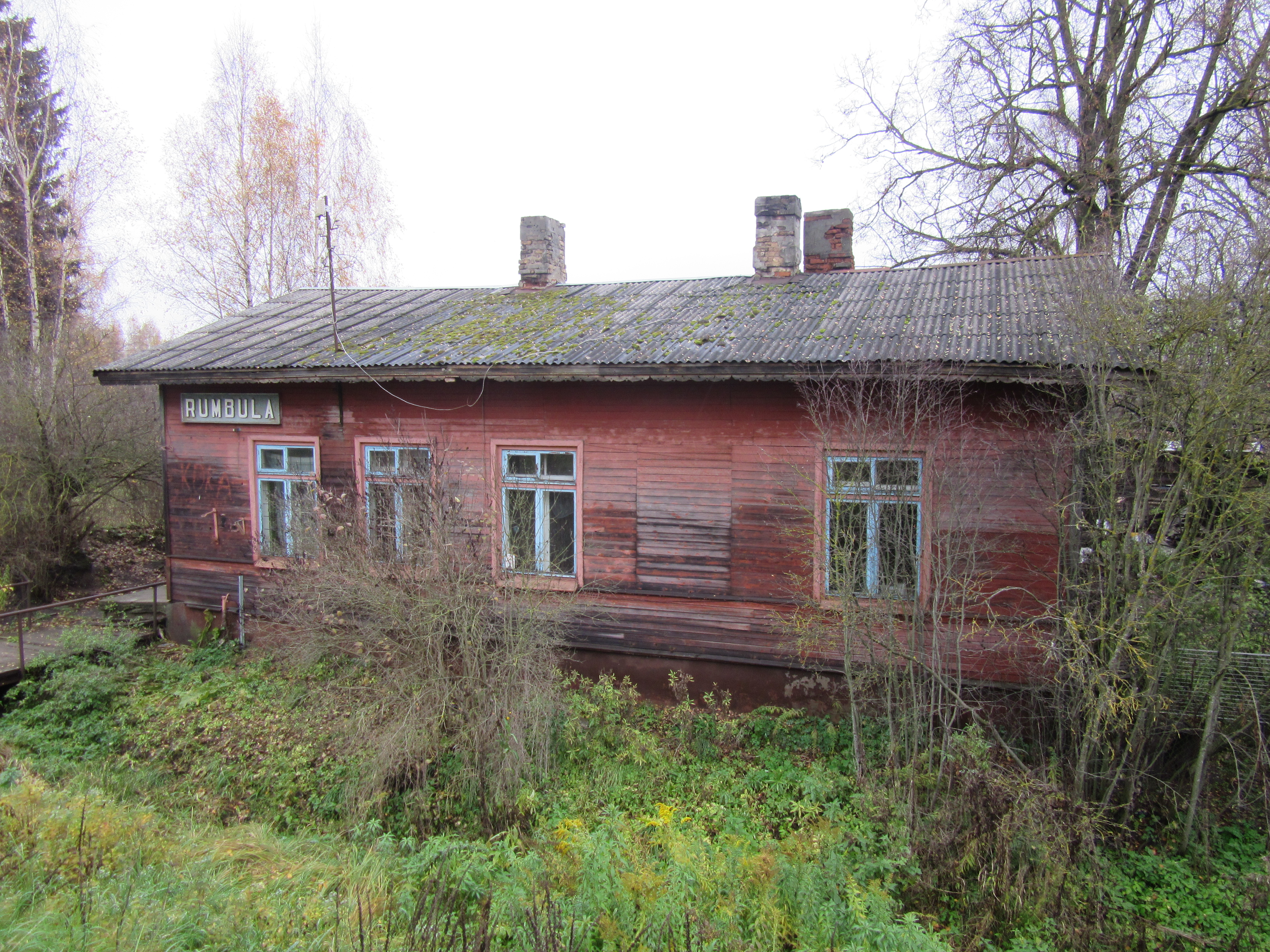
- Rumbula station building in 2021.

General information
- Location: Ropaži Municipality, Stopiņi parish
- Coordinates: 56°52′58.68″N 24°15′11.40″E
- Platforms: 2
- Tracks: 2

History
- Opened: 1921
- Former names: Dole

Services
Preceding station	LDz	Following station
Gaisma towards Riga	Riga–Daugavpils	Dārziņi towards Daugavpils
Location
- Location within Latvia

Rumbula Station is a railway station on the Riga – Daugavpils Railway in Latvia.
