= Ozolsala Station =

Railway station in Latvia

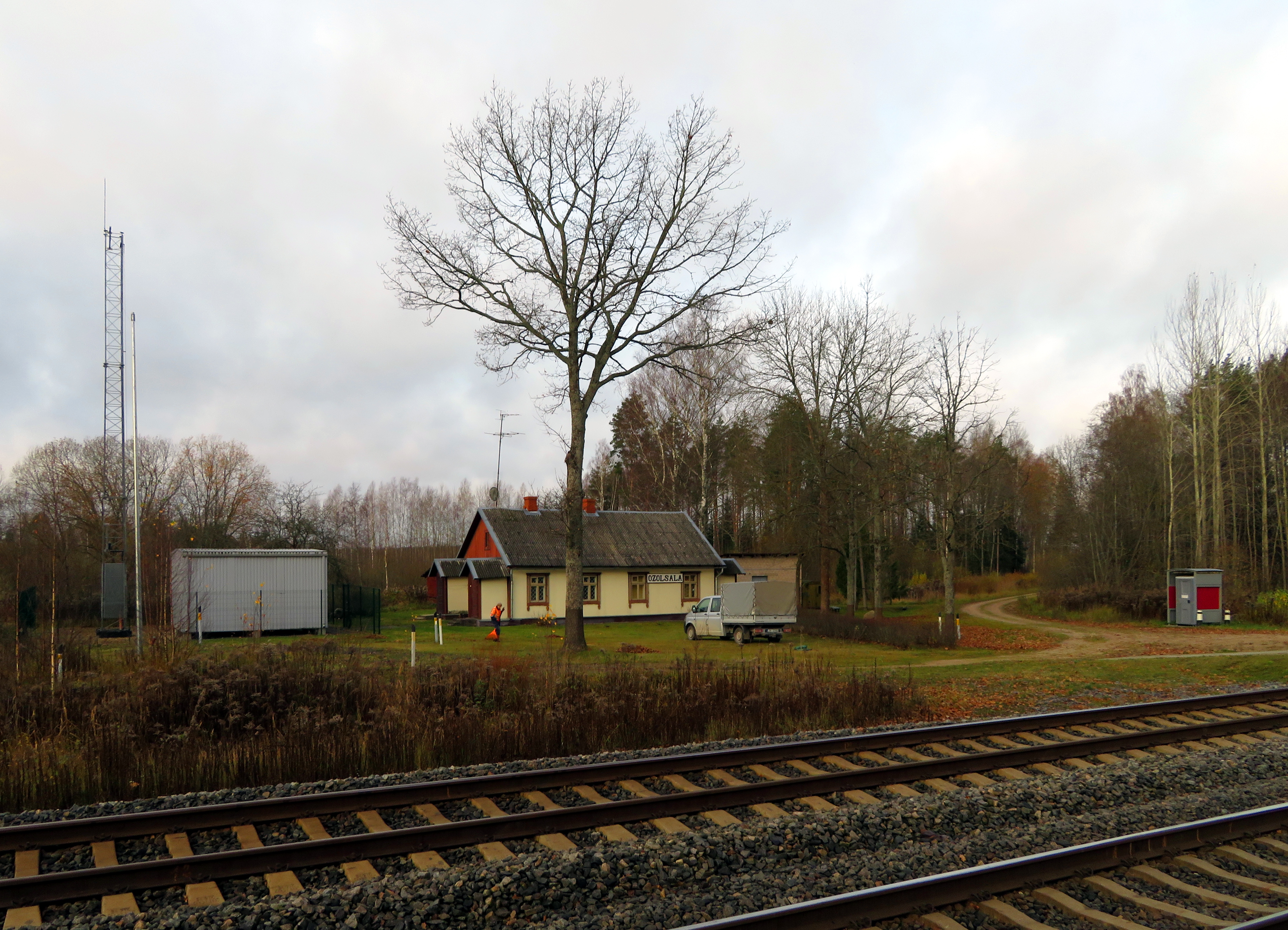

General information
- Location: Ozolsala 2, Krustpils parish, Jēkabpils Municipality
- Coordinates: 56°34′59.64″N 25°47′21.70″E
- Platforms: 2
- Tracks: 2

History
- Opened: 1942
- Closed: 2019
Location
- Location within Latvia

Ozolsala Station was a railway station on the Riga – Daugavpils Railway.

The station had two semi elevated platforms, and the stop has 2 tracks, and no turnouts.

In December 2019, along with 7 other stations on the Latvian Railway network, this station was closed, and no more trains stop at the Ozolsala Stop.
