= Indra Parish =

Parish of Latvia

- parish of Latvia
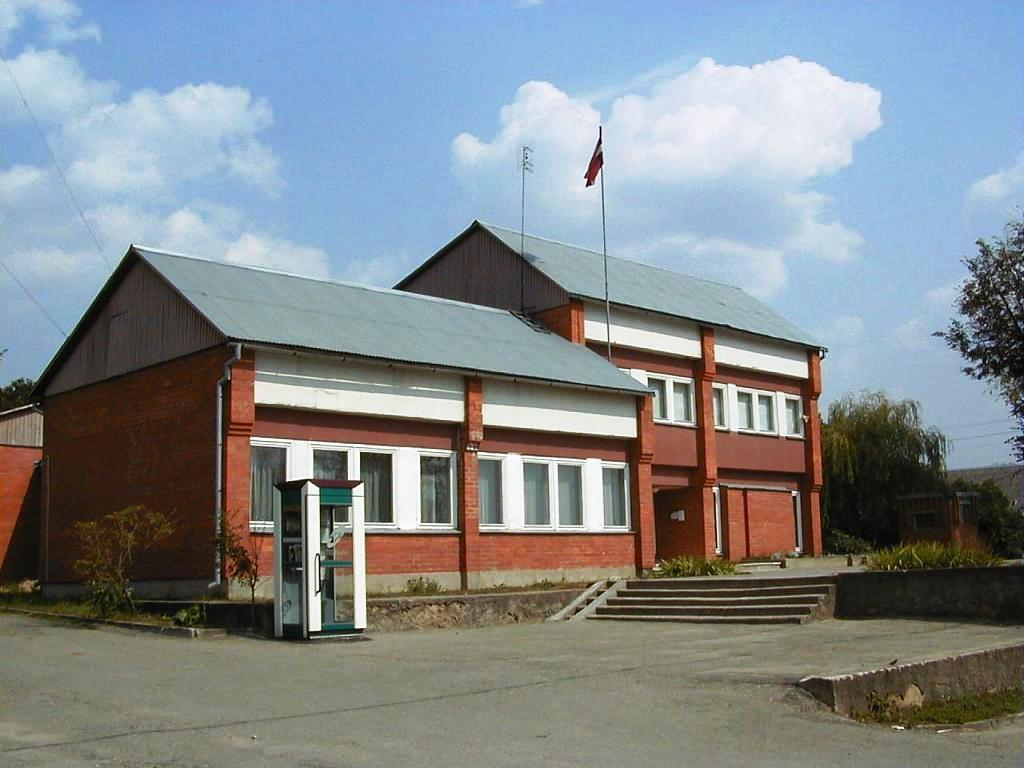

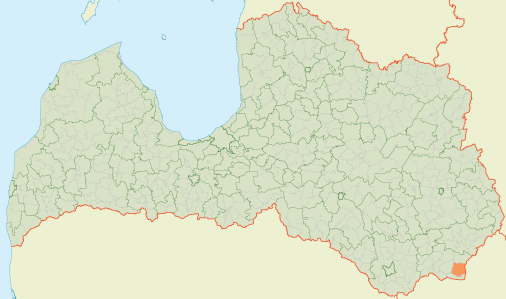
- 55°52′09″N 27°32′29″E
- Country: Latvia

Area
  - Total: 130.14 km^{2} (50.25 sq mi)
  - Land: 126.08 km^{2} (48.68 sq mi)
  - Water: 4.06 km^{2} (1.57 sq mi)

Population (1 January 2024)
  - Total: 725
  - Density: 5.6/km^{2} (14/sq mi)

Indra Parish (Latvian: Indras pagasts, Latgalian: Indra pogosts) is an administrative unit of Krāslava Municipality, Latvia.

== Transportation ==
Indra is home to a Latvian Railways station on the Daugavpils–Indra Railway line.

Services at Indra Station
- Preceding station	LDz	Following station
  Krāslava towards Daugavpils	Daugavpils-Indra	Terminus
