= Radviliškis–Daugavpils Railway =

Railway line in Lithuania and Latvia

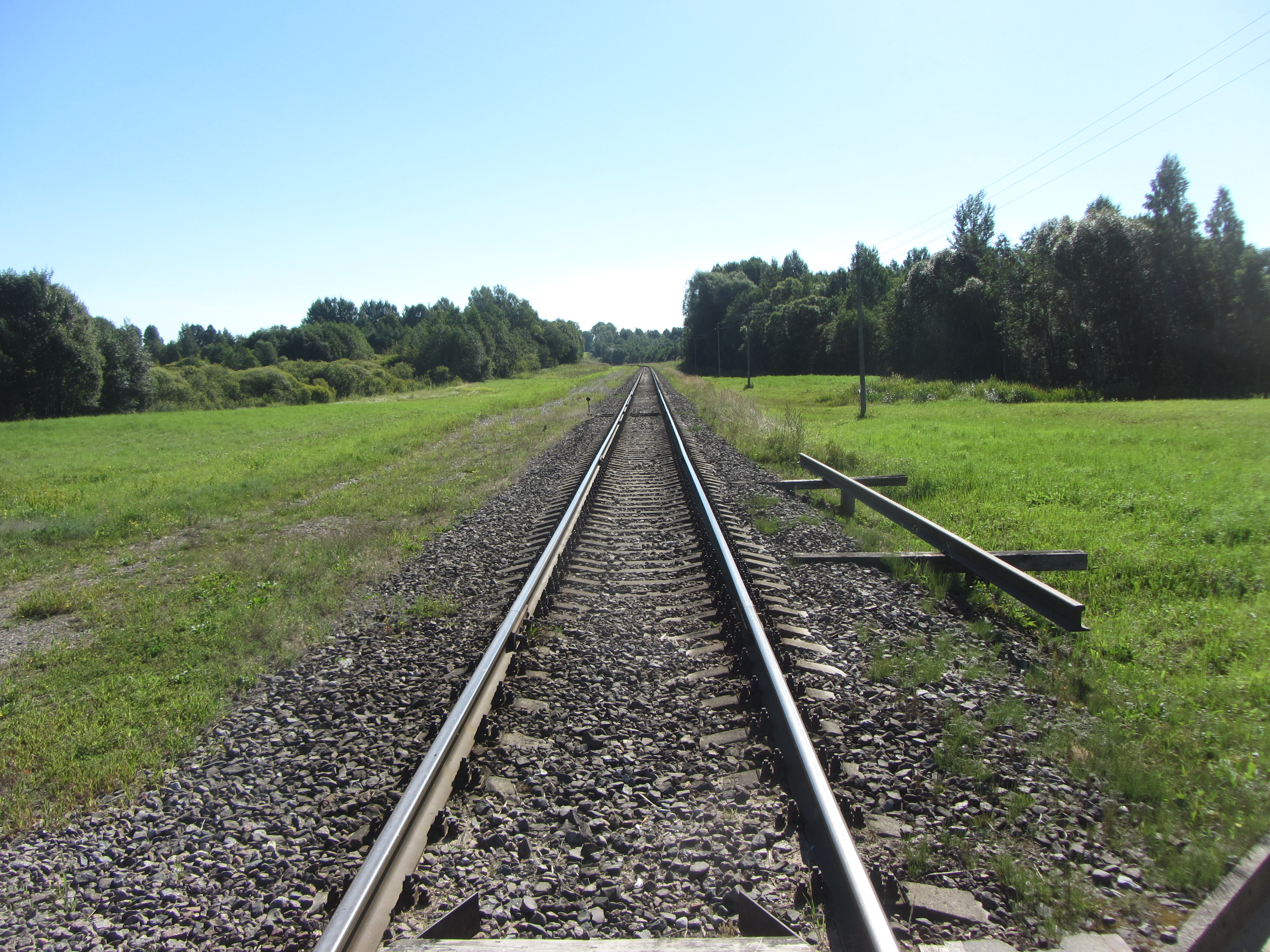

Overview
- Status: Operational
- Owner: Lietuvos geležinkeliai (LTG); Latvijas dzelzceļš (LDz)
- Termini: Radviliškis; Daugavpils
- Stations: 26

Service
- Type: Heavy rail
- System: Lithuanian railways Latvian railways

History
- Opened: 1873

Technical
- Track gauge: 1,520 mm (4 ft 11 27/32 in) Russian gauge
Route map
The railway in the Lithuanian rail system

The Radviliškis–Daugavpils Railway (Lithuanian: Radviliškio–Daugpilio geležinkelis; Latvian: Radvilišķu–Daugavpils dzelzceļa līnija) is a cross-border railway line in Lithuania and Latvia. It connects the city of Radviliškis in north-central Lithuania with the city of Daugavpils in south-eastern Latvia. It is one of the main local railways in Lithuania with connection to neighbouring Latvia.

The 1,520 mm (4 ft 11 27/32 in) gauge railway line is unelectrified and single-track throughout its length from Linkaičiai to Daugavpils, as the double-track between Rokiškis and Obeliai was dismantled in 2002.

The railway was opened in 1873 as a branch line of the Libau–Romny Railway system which connected Ukraine with the Baltic Seaport of Liepāja (formerly: Libau).

== Stations ==
- Radviliškis
- Linkaičiai
- Šeduva
- Laba
- Labutiai
- Dapšionys
- Gustoniai
- Panevėžys
- Kaubariškis
- Karsakiškis
- Bygailiai
- Subačius
- Radžiūnai
- Kupiškis
- Skapiškis
- Kepuriškis
- Panemunėlis
- Tindžiuliai
- Rokiškis
- Obeliai
- Šapeliai
- Eglaine
- Ilūkste
- Sventa
- Grīva
- Daugavpils

== See also ==
- Transport in Lithuania
- Transport in Latvia
- Rail transport in Lithuania
- Rail transport in Latvia
- History of rail transport in Lithuania
- History of rail transport in Latvia
