= Radviliškis =

- City
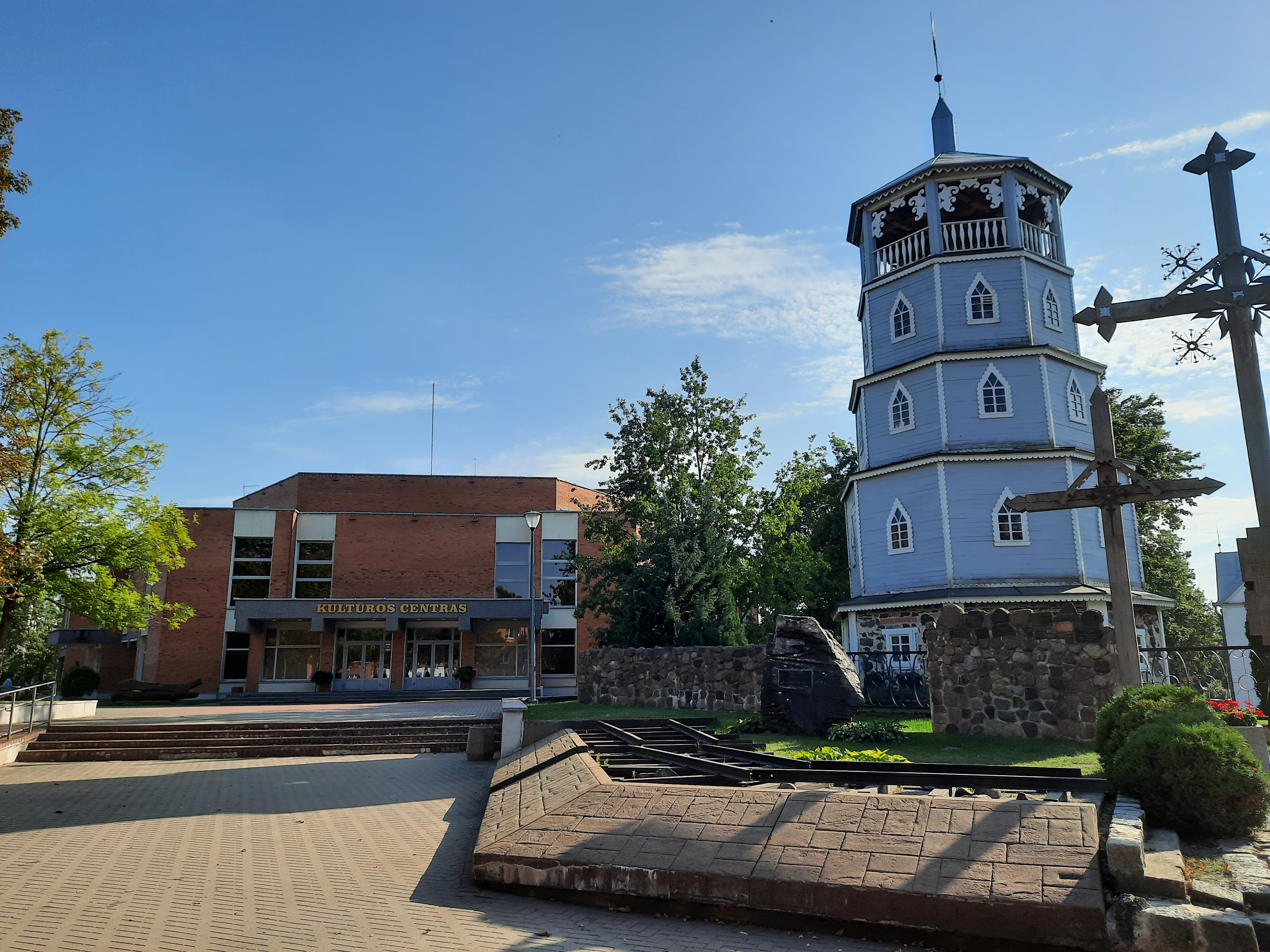
- Culture Center and bell tower

- Flag Coat of arms

- Location of Radviliškis
- Coordinates: 55°48′N 23°33′E
- Country: Lithuania
- Ethnographic region: Aukštaitija
- County: Šiauliai County
- Municipality: Radviliškis district municipality
- Eldership: Radviliškis town eldership Radviliškis eldership
- Capital of: Radviliškis district municipality Radviliškis town eldership Radviliškis eldership
- First mentioned: 1529
- Granted city rights: 1923

Government
  - Mayor: Kazimieras Račkauskis

Population (2022)
  - Total: 14,976
- Demonym(s): Radviliškian(s) (English) radviliškiečiai (Lithuanian)
- Time zone: UTC+2 (EET)
  - Summer (DST): UTC+3 (EEST)
- Website: radviliskis.lt

Radviliškis (Note: Polish: Radziwiliszki; Yiddish: ראדווילישאָק, Radvilishok) is a city in the Radviliškis district municipality, Šiauliai County, in north-central Lithuania. Radviliškis has been the administrative center of the district since 1950, and is an important railway junction.

== History ==
Radviliškis was founded at the end of the 15th century. It was first mentioned in the book on state economics by M. Downar-Zapolsky listing the cities taxpayers in 1567. In 1687, King John III Sobieski granted the right of holding a market to it.

Radviliškis was devastated many times by military forces, plague and hunger in the 17th–19th centuries. There were no citizens left in Radviliškis after the plague in 1708–1710.

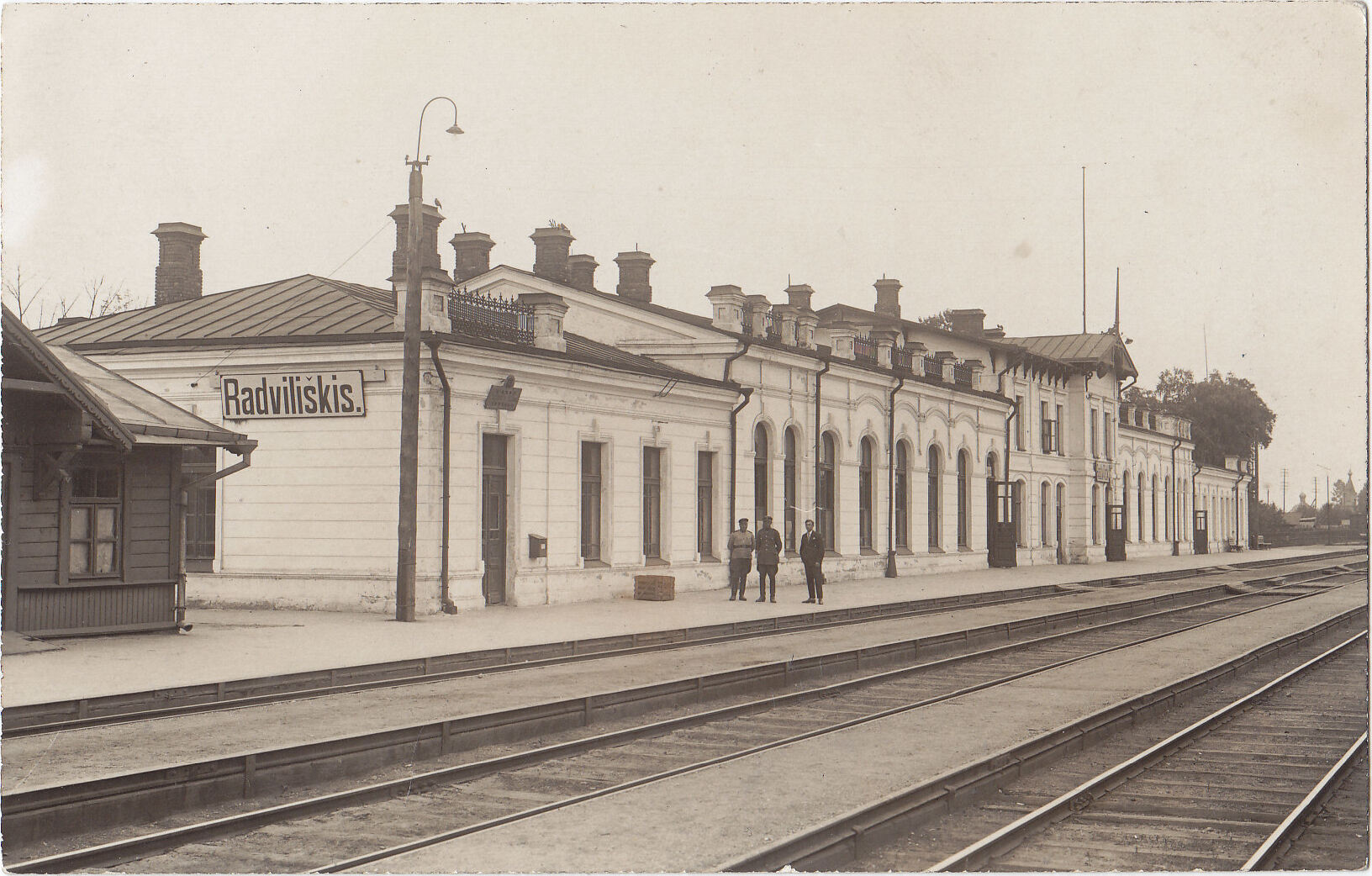
Radviliškis railway station c. 1920

City growth began when the Liepāja–Romny Railway line, crossing the city, was built in 1870. It was joined by the Radviliškis–Daugavpils Railway in 1873. Railwaymen constituted the majority of the residents.

During World War II, from 1940 it was occupied by the Soviet Union, then from 1941 by Nazi Germany, and then from 1944 it was re-occupied the Soviet Union. Around July 12, 1941, all 300 Jews of Radviliškis were murdered in the Durpynas Forest near the Jewish cemetery by Germans and Lithuanian Activist Front members from Radviliškis.

In 1998, a sculpture of the Victory goddess Nike was unveiled in the center of Radviliškis to commemorate the eightieth anniversary of the victory over the united German–Russian West Russian Volunteer Army. It was created by sculptor P. Mazuras.

On July 27th 2011, a major F2 tornado stuck Radviliškis, causing severe damage to houses and trees, and damaging cars and trucks. This is one of the most strongest tornadoes to have ever hit Lithuania.

== Name and coat of arms ==
Supposedly, the name originated from the name of the noble Radziwiłł (Radvila) family of Lithuanian origin. This family ruled Radviliškis for more than 200 years, from 1546 to 1764.

A rising and light-emitting horse, representing communication, motion, city development and flourishing, is depicted in the coat of arms of Radviliškis. The light is a symbol of civilization's role in the city development. It was created by artist Laima Ramonienė in 1992.

== Attractions ==
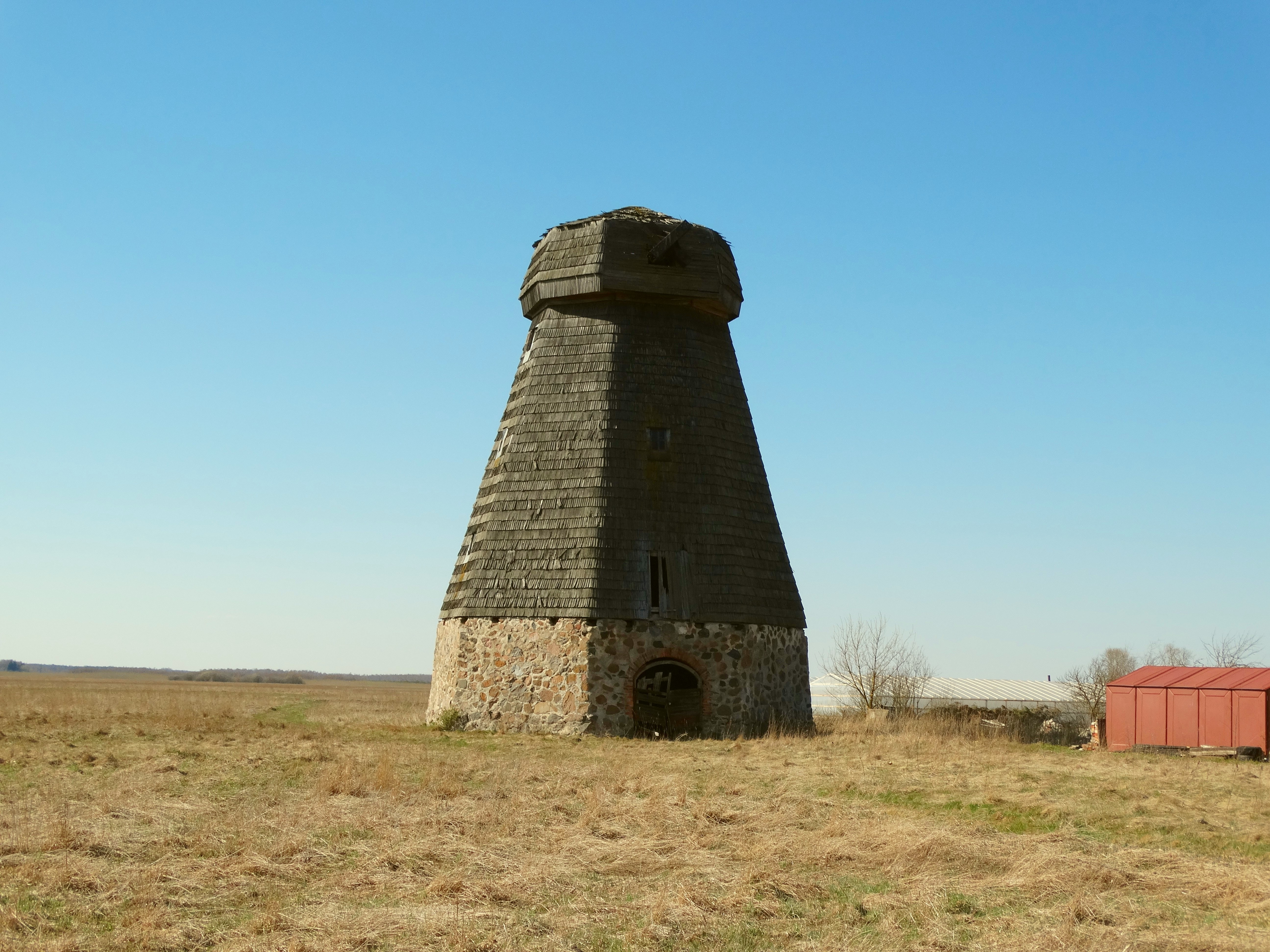
Windmill near Radviliškis

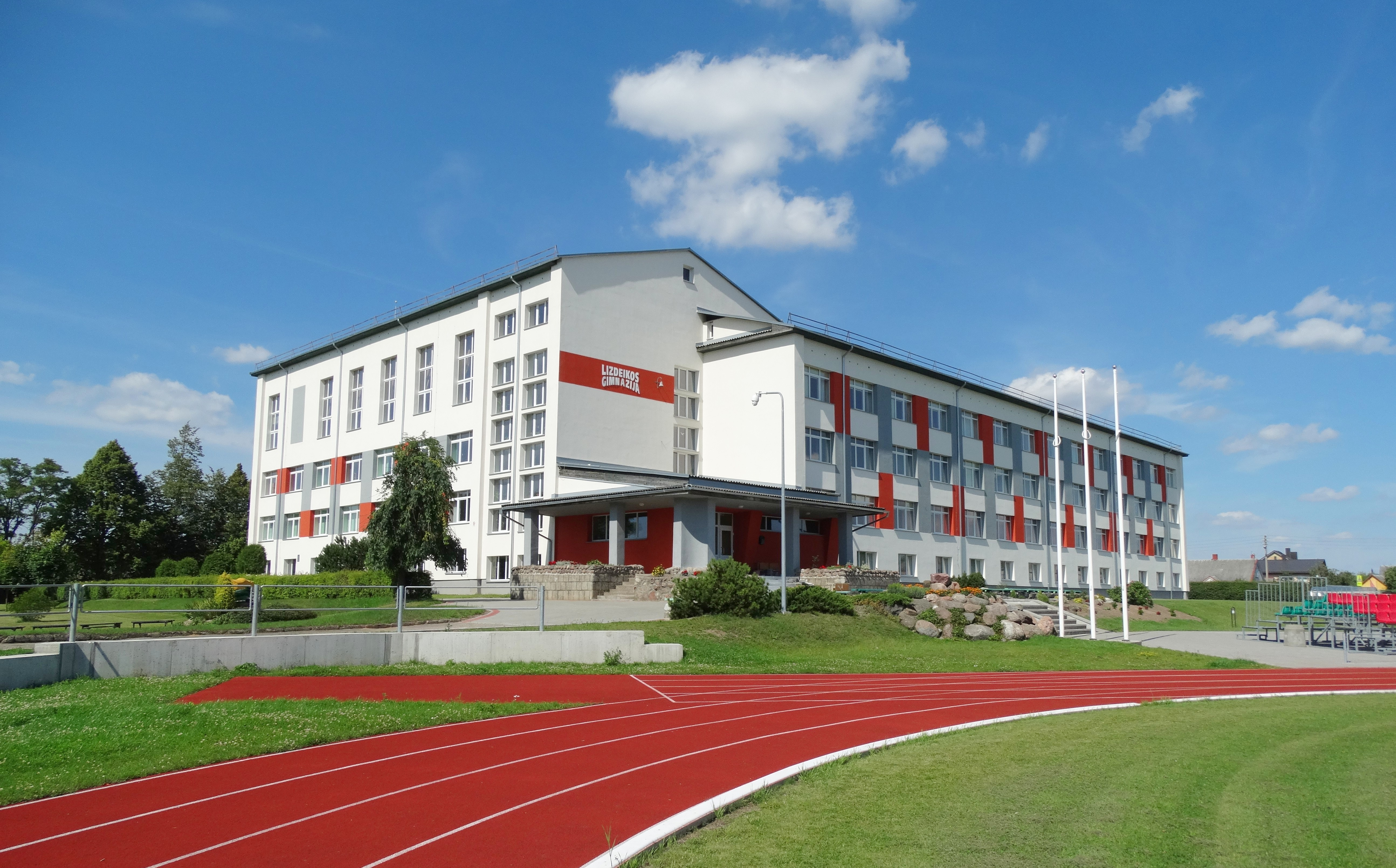
Lizdeika Gymnasium

Radviliškis, settled on everglades, was famous for its railway and black-from-locomotive-smoke sparrows.

The two symbols of the city are the railways, and black swallows.

There are Evangelical-reformed, Protestant, Lutheran, and Orthodox chapels, Jewish synagogues and Catholic Churches in Radviliškis.

The stone windmill of Radviliškis was erected in remembrance of the violent and triumphant battles in 1919 against the German–Russian armed forces(Bermontians).

The wooden belfry of Radviliškis parish's Blessed Virgin Mary church of the Immaculate Conception is a topical architecture monument. It was set in 1878. The belfry burned twice. It was reconstructed in 1984.

== Twin towns – sister cities ==
Radviliškis is twinned with:

- Bauska, Latvia
- Daliyat al-Karmel, Israel
- Gniezno, Poland
- Grodzisk Mazowiecki, Poland
- Kadzidło, Poland
- (Georgia (country)) Khashuri, Georgia
- Lillehammer, Norway
- Saint-Seine-l'Abbaye, France
- Skara, Sweden
- Uman, Ukraine
