= Daugavpils–Kurcums Railway =

Railway line in Latvia

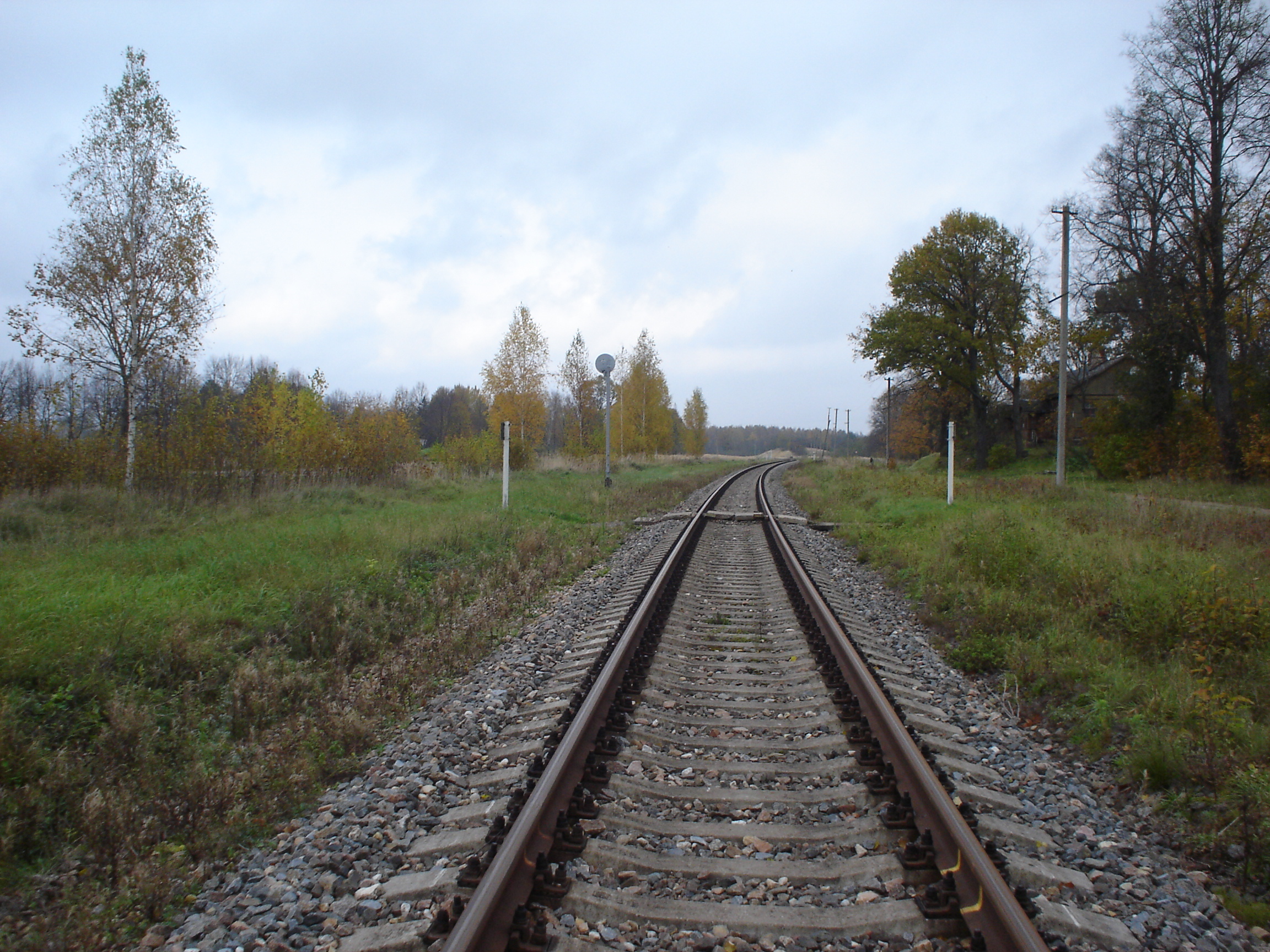

Overview
- Status: Operational
- Owner: Latvijas dzelzceļš (LDz)
- Termini: Daugavpils Station; Latvia–Lithuania border

Service
- Type: Heavy-rail
- System: Latvian railways

History
- Opened: 1862

Technical
- Line length: 25 km (15.53 mi)
- Number of tracks: Single-track
- Track gauge: 1,520 mm (4 ft 11 27/32 in) Russian gauge
Route map
Railway lines in Latvia in 2016.

The Daugavpils–Kurcums Railway is a 25 kilometres (16 mi) long, cross-border railway line in southeastern Latvia. The railway line connects the city of Daugavpils with Latvia's border with Lithuania from where it continues in Lithuania as the Vilnius–Turmantas Railway to Vilnius.

The 1,520 mm (4 ft 11 27/32 in) gauge railway line is single-track and unelectrified for its entire length. It is managed by Latvijas dzelzceļš (LDz), Latvia's state-owned railway infrastructure manager.

The railway line was built in the 19th century to connect Daugavpils and Vilnius as part of the Saint Petersburg–Warsaw Railway.

== See also ==
- Transport in Latvia
- Rail transport in Latvia
- History of rail transport in Latvia

== Bibliography ==
- Altbergs, T.; Augustāne, K.; Pētersone, I. (2009). Dzelzceļi Latvijā [Railways in Latvia] (in Latvian). Jumava. ISBN 978-9984-38-698-0.
