= Daugavpils–Indra Railway =

Railway line in Latvia

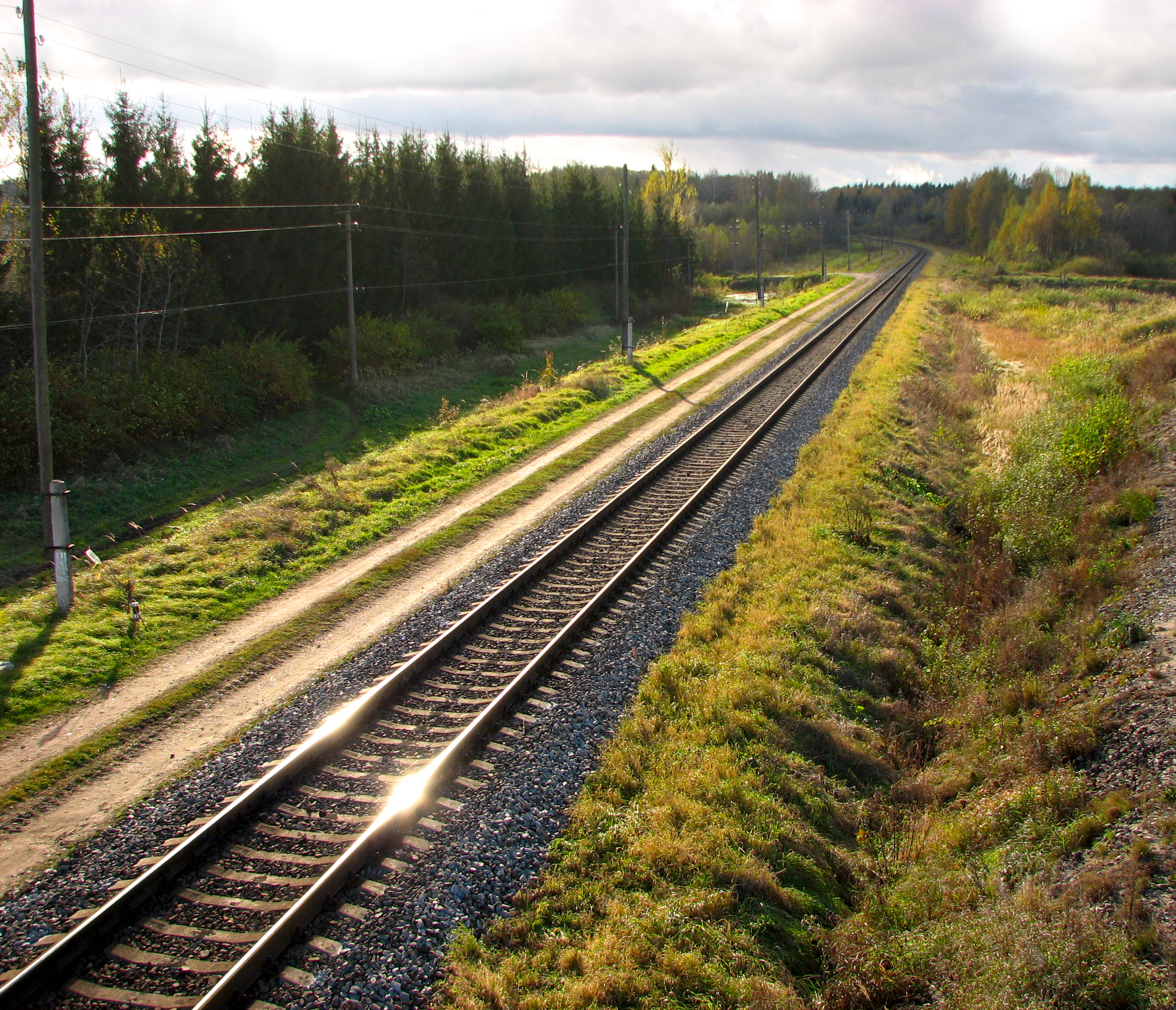

Overview
- Status: Operational
- Owner: Latvijas dzelzceļš (LDz)
- Termini: Daugavpils Station; Belarus–Latvia border

Service
- Type: Heavy-rail
- System: Latvian railways
- Operator(s): Pasažieru vilciens (Vivi)

History
- Opened: 1866

Technical
- Line length: 76 km (47.22 mi)
- Number of tracks: Single track (Daugavpils–Indra); Double track (Indra–Bigosovo)
- Character: Passenger trains Freight trains
- Track gauge: 1,520 mm (4 ft 11 27/32 in) Russian gauge
Route map
Railway lines in Latvia in 2016.

The Daugavpils–Indra Railway is a 76 kilometres (47 mi) long cross-border railway line in southeastern Latvia. The railway line connects the city of Daugavpils with Latvia's border with Belarus from where it continues in Belarus as the Polotsk–Bigosovo Railway to Polotsk. It is the only direct rail connection between Latvia and Belarus.

The 1,520 mm (4 ft 11 27/32 in) gauge railway line is unelectrified and single-track, except for the section across the border between Indra and Bigosovo which is double-track. It is managed by Latvijas dzelzceļš (LDz), Latvia's state-owned railway infrastructure manager.

The railway line was built in the 19th century to connect Daugavpils and Polotsk as part of the Daugavpils–Vitebsk Railway.

== See also ==
- Transport in Latvia
- Rail transport in Latvia
- History of rail transport in Latvia

== Bibliography ==
- Altbergs, T.; Augustāne, K.; Pētersone, I. (2009). Dzelzceļi Latvijā [Railways in Latvia] (in Latvian). Jumava. ISBN 978-9984-38-698-0.
