= Riga–Daugavpils Railway =

Railway line in Latvia

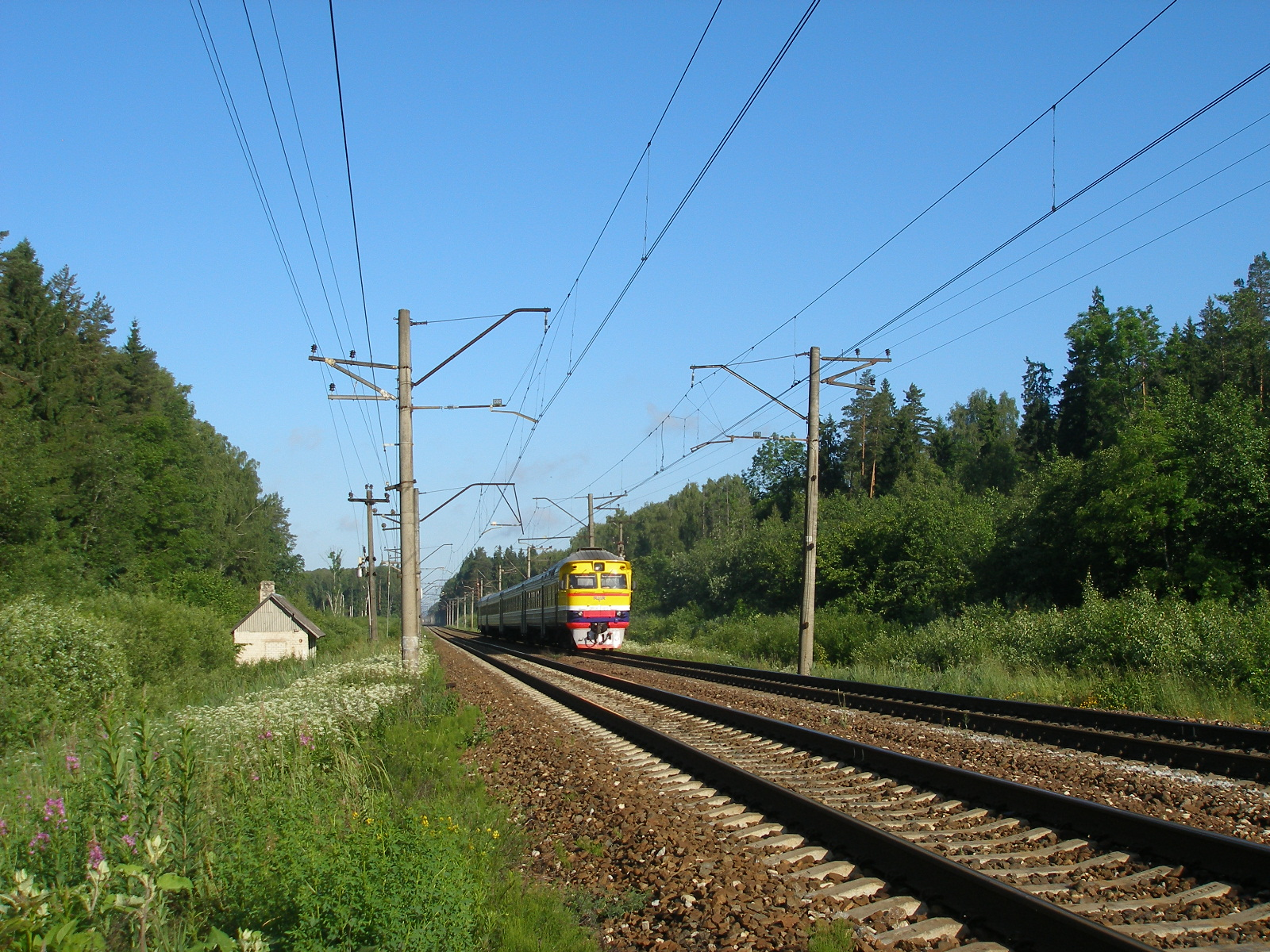
- A train at Dendrārijs on the Riga - Daugavpils railway line

Overview
- Termini: Riga Central Station; Daugavpils Station

Service
- Operator(s): Latvian Railways

History
- Opened: 1861

Technical
- Line length: 218 km (135 mi)
- Track gauge: 1,520 mm (4 ft 11 27/32 in) Russian gauge

The Riga–Daugavpils railway line (Latvian: Dzelzceļa līnija Rīga—Daugavpils) is a 218-kilometre (135 mi) long railway line in Latvia that connects the cities of Riga in central Latvia and Daugavpils in south-eastern Latvia.

The railway line is double track between Riga and Krustpils and single track between Krustpils and Daugavpils. It is electrified between Riga and Aizkraukle. The track gauge is 1,520 mm (4 ft 11 27/32 in) (Russian gauge). It was built in 1861, and is one of the oldest railway lines in Latvia.

== History ==
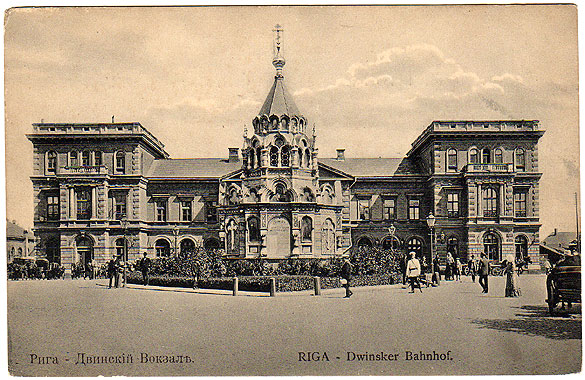
View of Dvinsk Station in Riga (before 1893 Dinaburg Station, later called Riga Central Station), western terminus of the Riga–Daugavpils railway line. The building was demolished in the 1950s.

The railway line was opened on 21 September 1861 as one of the first railway lines in the present territory of Latvia. It was a part of the Riga–Oryol railway line, a 15,467 km (9,611 mi) long railway line in the Russian Empire, constructed to connect the Baltic Sea at Riga with Oryol in central Russia. At Daugavpils the line connected with the Saint Petersburg–Warsaw Railway, and thus joined the city of Riga with the Russian rail network. In 1894, the line became the property of the state.

Railway lines in Latvia in 2016.

== See also ==
- Rail transport in Latvia
- History of rail transport in Latvia

== Bibliography ==
- Altbergs, T.; Augustāne, K.; Pētersone, I. (2009). Dzelzceļi Latvijā [Railways in Latvia] (in Latvian). Jumava. ISBN 978-9984-38-698-0.
