= Daugavpils Station =

Railway station in Latvia

Daugavpils
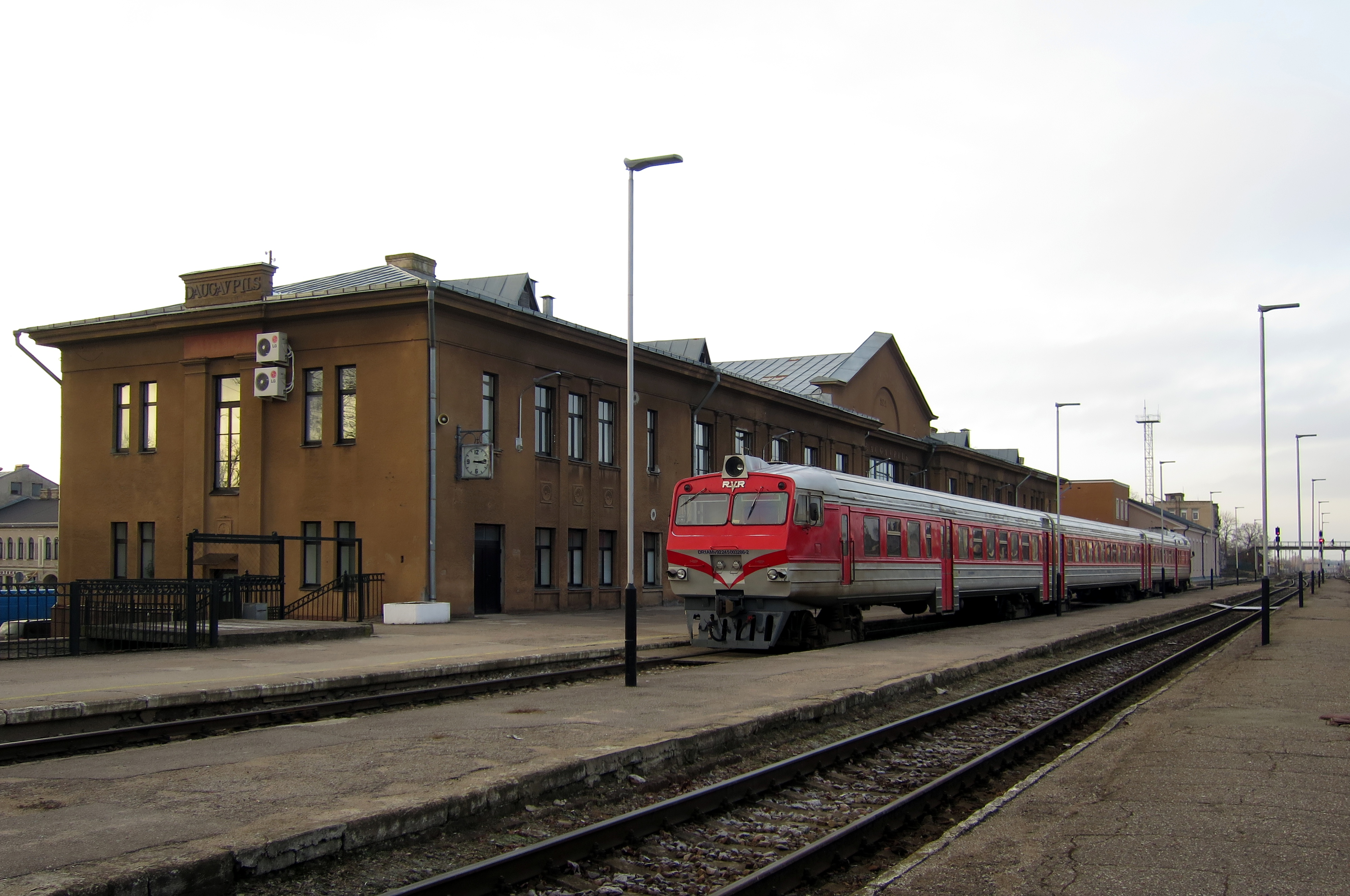
- Daugavpils station in 2018

General information
- Location: 47 Stacijas Street, Daugavpils
- Coordinates: 55°52′29.70″N 26°31′38.98″E
- Operator: Latvian Railways
- Lines: Riga–Daugavpils; Daugavpils–Indra; Radviliškis–Daugavpils; Daugavpils–Kurcums
- Platforms: 3

History
- Opened: 1861
- Rebuilt: 1951
- Former names: Dinaburg (Динабург), Dvinsk (Двинск)

Services
Preceding station	LDz	Following station
Līksna towards Riga	Riga–Daugavpils	Terminus
Līksna towards Riga	Riga–Daugavpils	Krāslava Certain trains Terminus
Terminus	Daugavpils-Indra	Krāslava towards Indra
Location
- Location within Latvia railways

Daugavpils Station (Latvian: Daugavpils Pasažieru parks) is the main railway station serving the city of Daugavpils in south-eastern Latvia.

The station is an important railway junction, which is the terminus of the Riga–Daugavpils and Daugavpils–Indra railway lines. There are no more Riga – Minsk trains and the direct service to Vilnius was stopped in 2020. There is service on the Latvian railway lines Riga-Daugavpils, 4 times per day, Riga-Kraslava, 5 times per week, Riga-Indra twice per week, and Riga-Aglona once per year.

Daugavpils Satiksme provides bus and tram routes including the station.

== Gallery ==
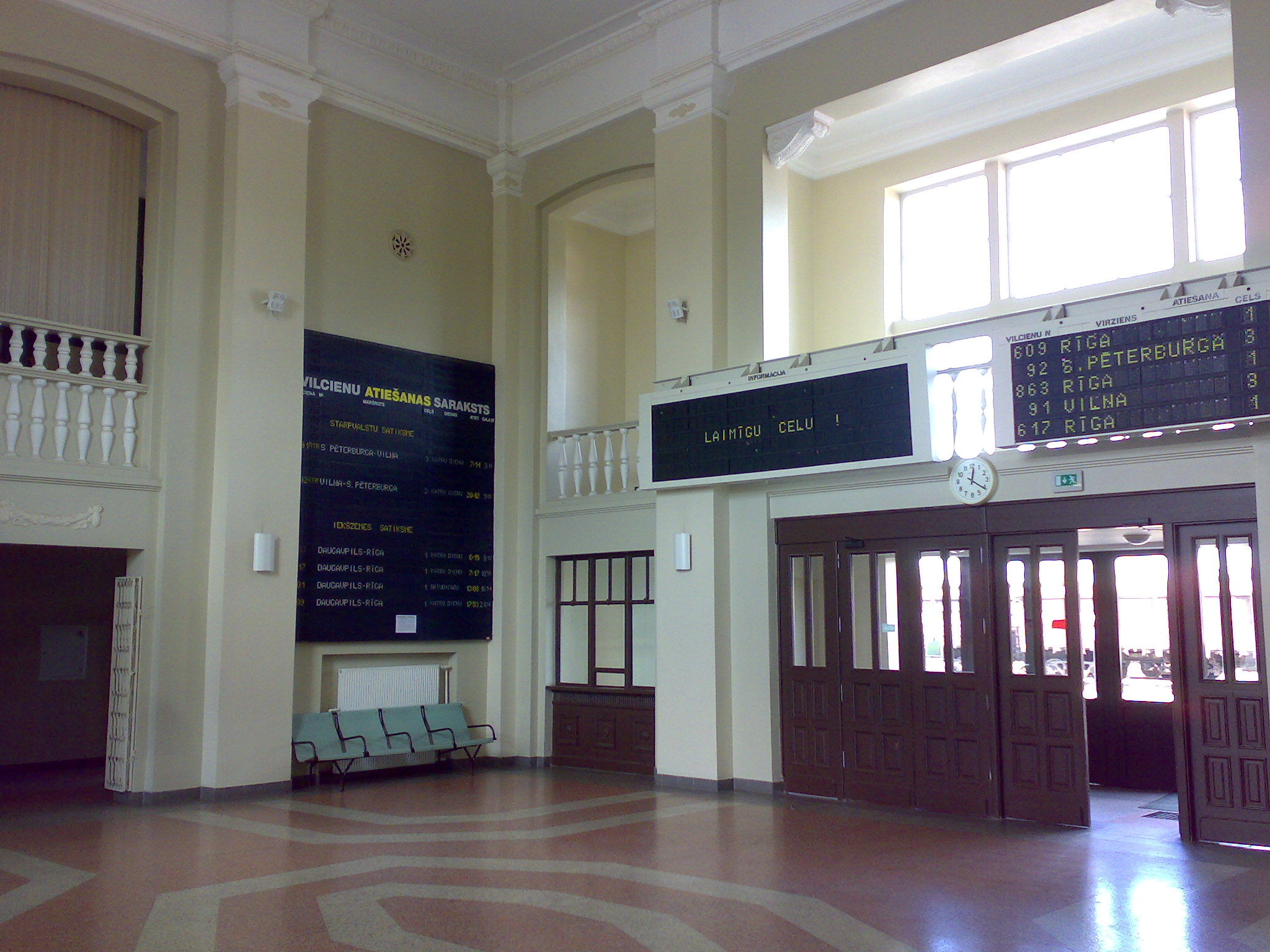
Entrance hall

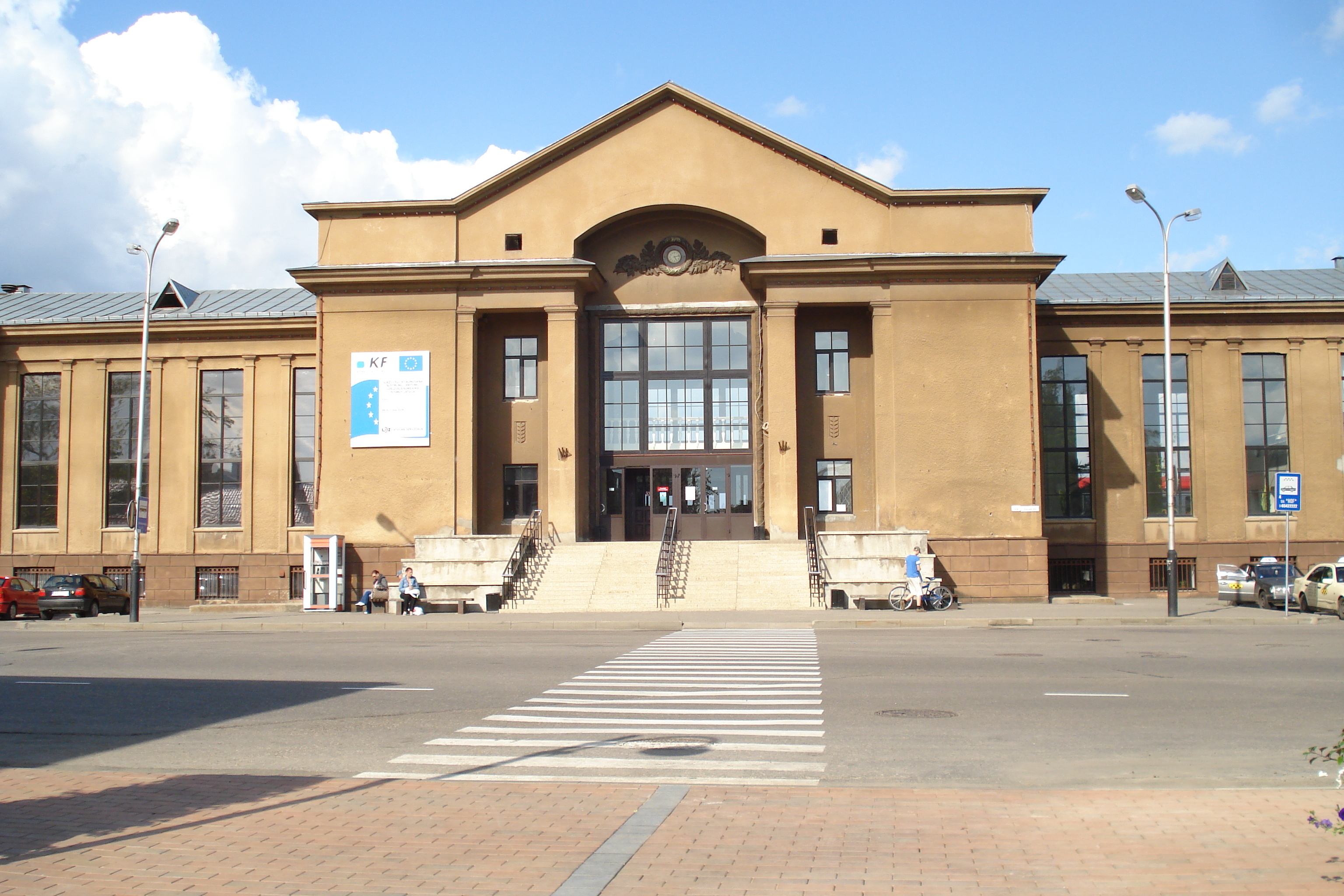
View from the street (2009)

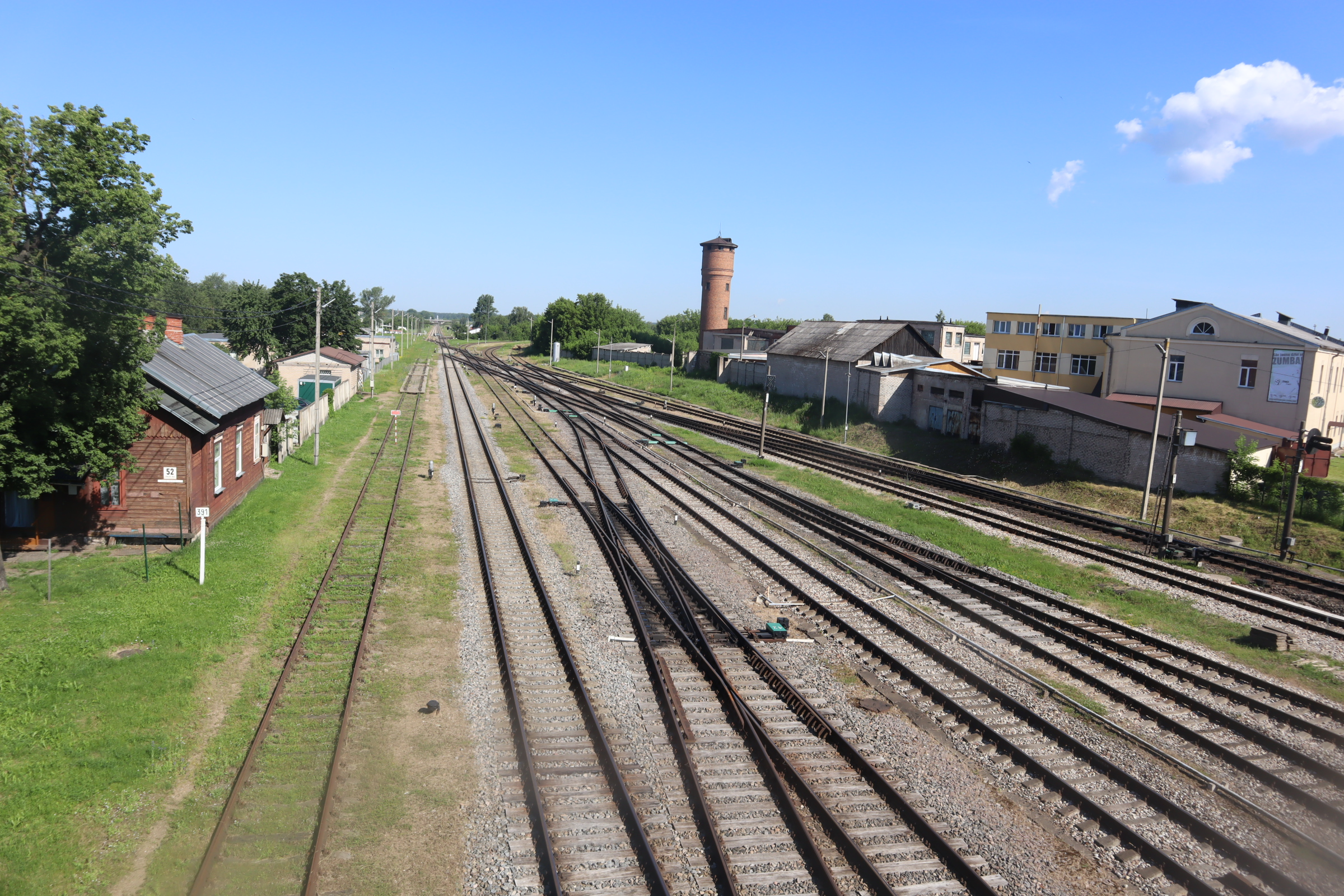
Towards Riga

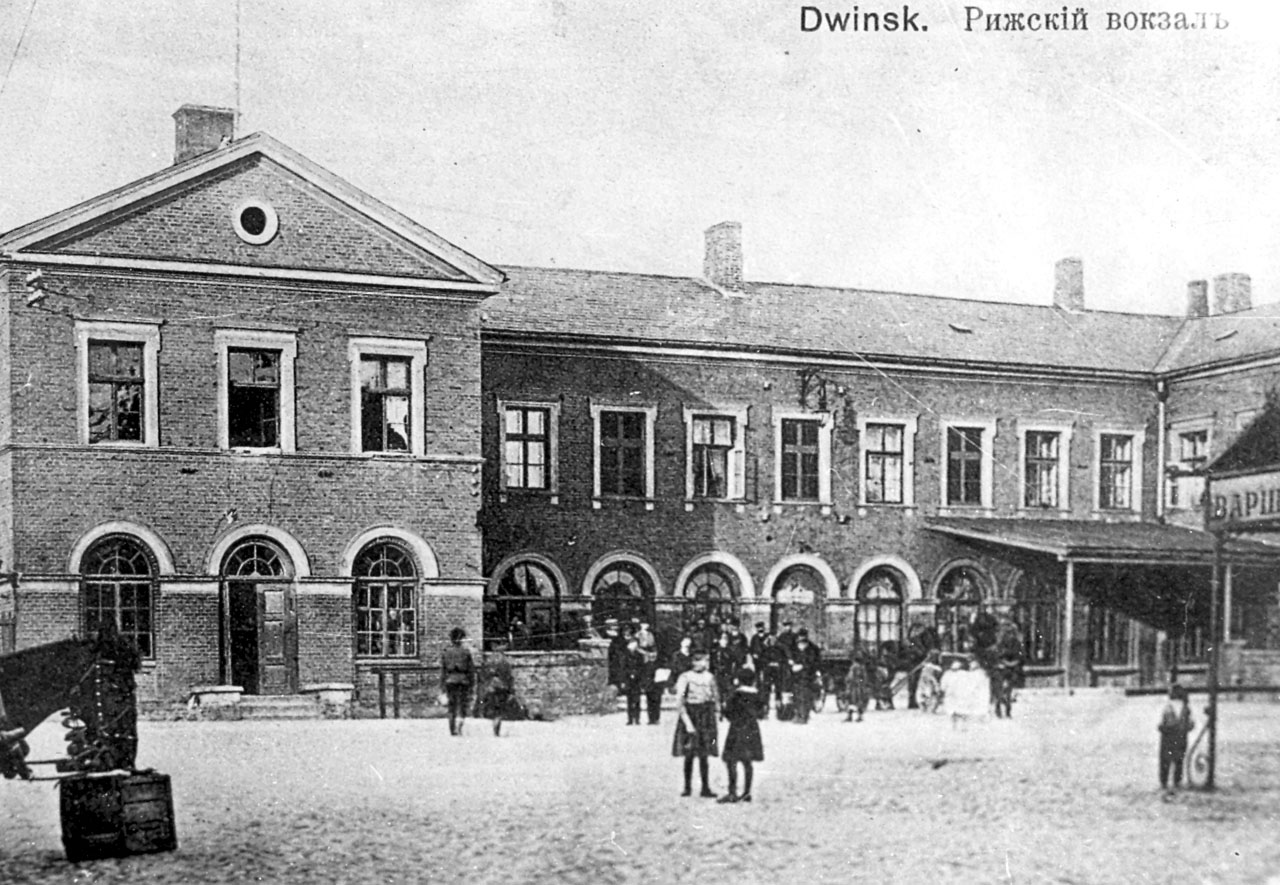
Previous station building

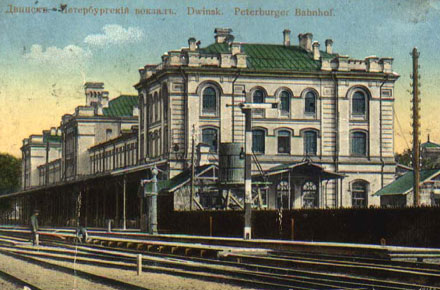
St Petersburg–Warsaw line station

== See also ==
- Transport in Latvia
- Rail transport in Latvia
- History of rail transport in Latvia
