= Biksti Station =

Railway station in Latvia

Biksti
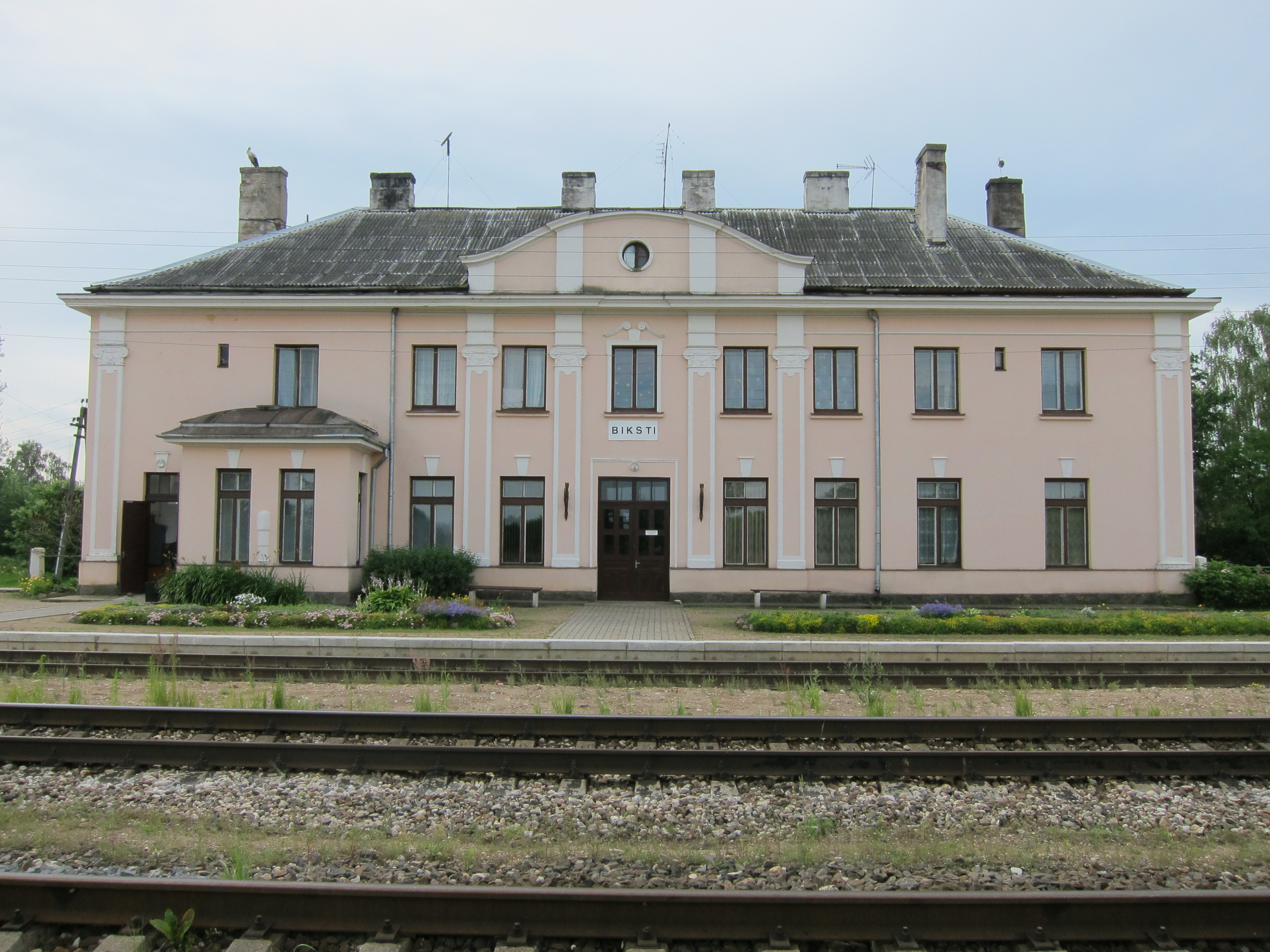

General information
- Location: Biksti; Biksti Parish, Dobele Municipality; Latvia
- Coordinates: 56°41′30.10″N 22°58′52.02″E
- Line: Jelgava–Liepāja Railway
- Platforms: 1
- Tracks: 3

History
- Opened: 1927

Services
Preceding station	LDz	Following station
Dobele towards Jelgava	Jelgava–Liepāja	Saldus towards Liepāja
Location
- Location within Latvia

Biksti Station is a railway station on the Jelgava – Liepāja Railway.
