= Saldus Station =

Railway station in Saldus, Latvia

Saldus
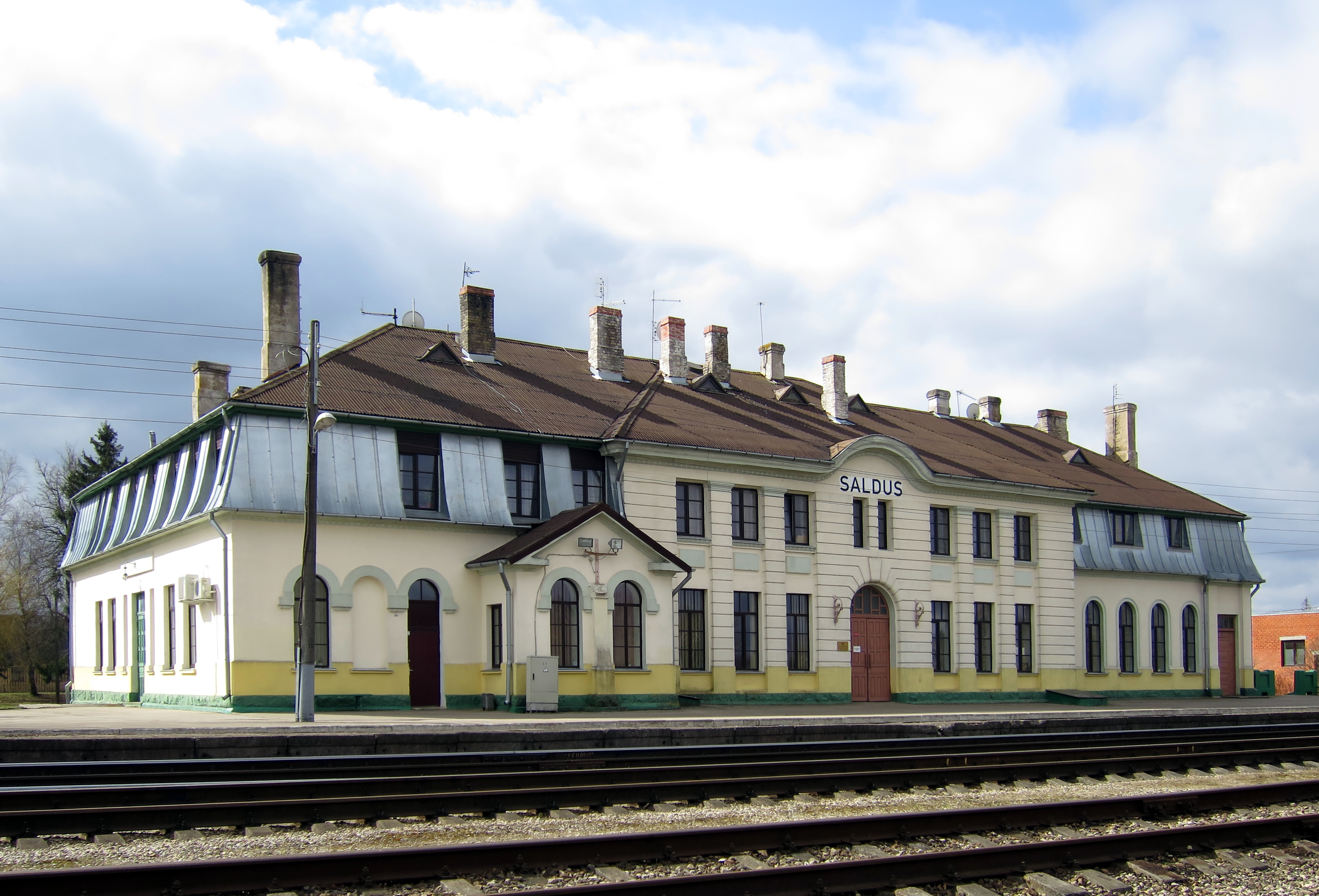

General information
- Location: Saldus stacija Saldus Parish, Saldus Municipality; Latvia
- Coordinates: 56°41′10.08″N 22°28′19.24″E
- Line: Jelgava–Liepāja Railway
- Platforms: 2
- Tracks: 5

History
- Opened: 1928

Services
Preceding station	LDz	Following station
Biksti towards Jelgava	Jelgava–Liepāja	Skrunda towards Liepāja
Location
- Location within Latvia

Saldus Station is a railway station on the Jelgava – Liepāja Railway.
