= Dobele Station =

Railway station in Latvia

Dobele
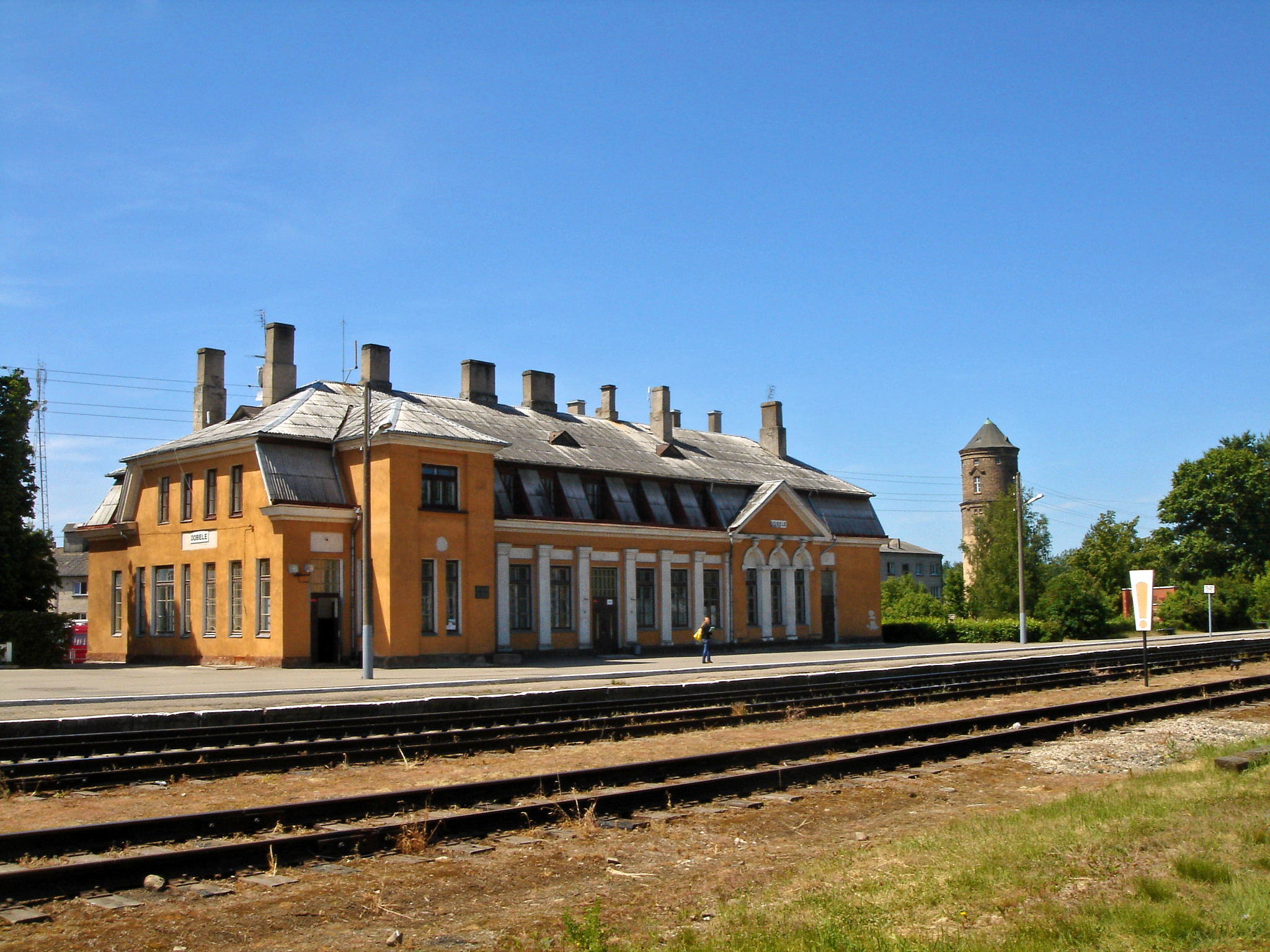

General information
- Location: Stacijas iela 2 Dobele, Dobele Municipality; Latvia
- Coordinates: 56°37′43.12″N 23°17′4.24″E
- Owner: Latvijas dzelzceļš (LDz)
- Line: Jelgava–Liepāja Railway
- Platforms: 1
- Tracks: 5
- Train operators: Vivi

History
- Opened: 1927

Services
Preceding station	LDz	Following station
Jelgava Terminus	Jelgava–Liepāja	Biksti towards Liepāja
Location

Dobele Station is a railway station serving the town of Dobele in Dobele Municipality of the Semigallia region of southern Latvia. The station is located on the Jelgava–Liepāja Railway.

== Gallery ==
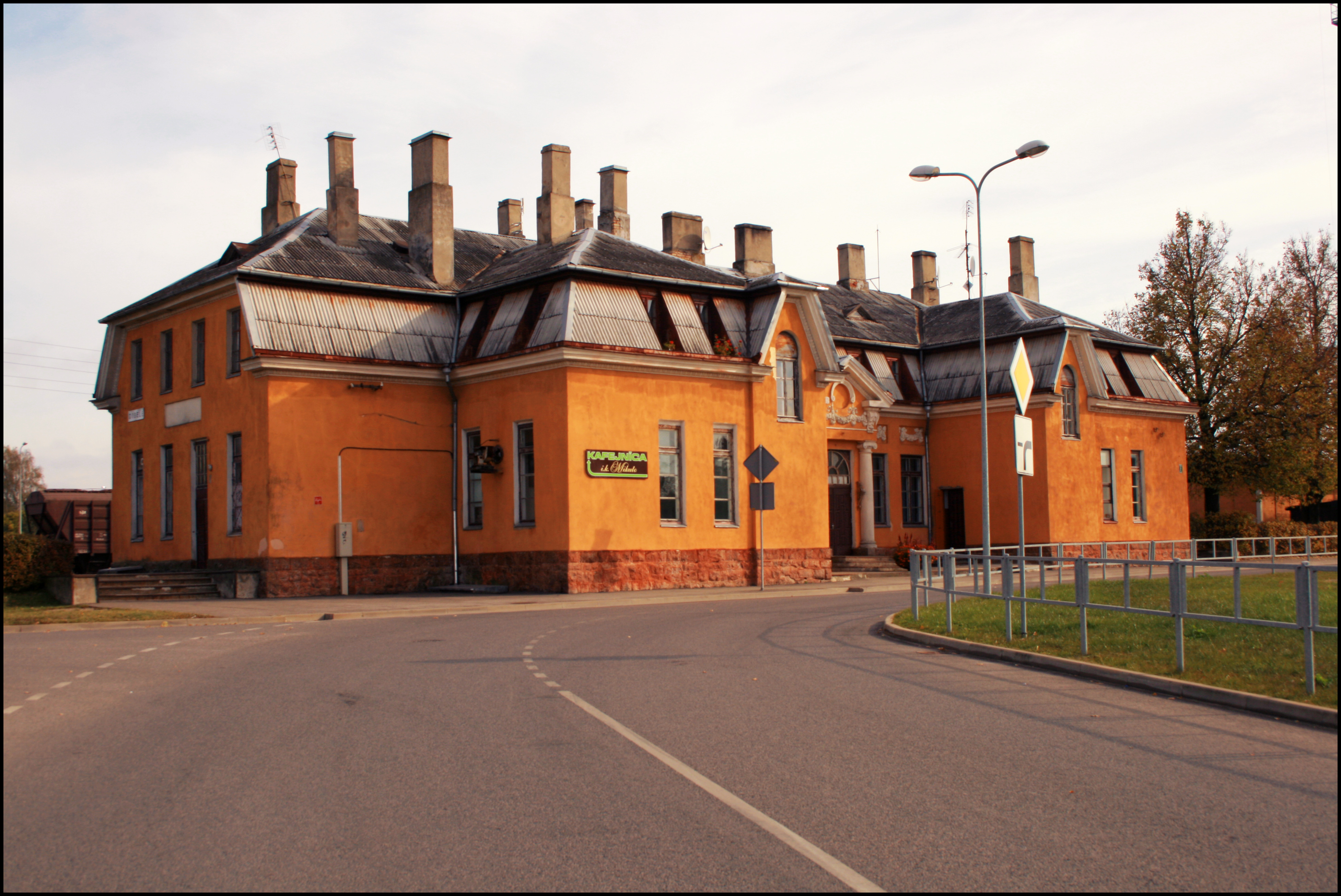
Street facade of the station building

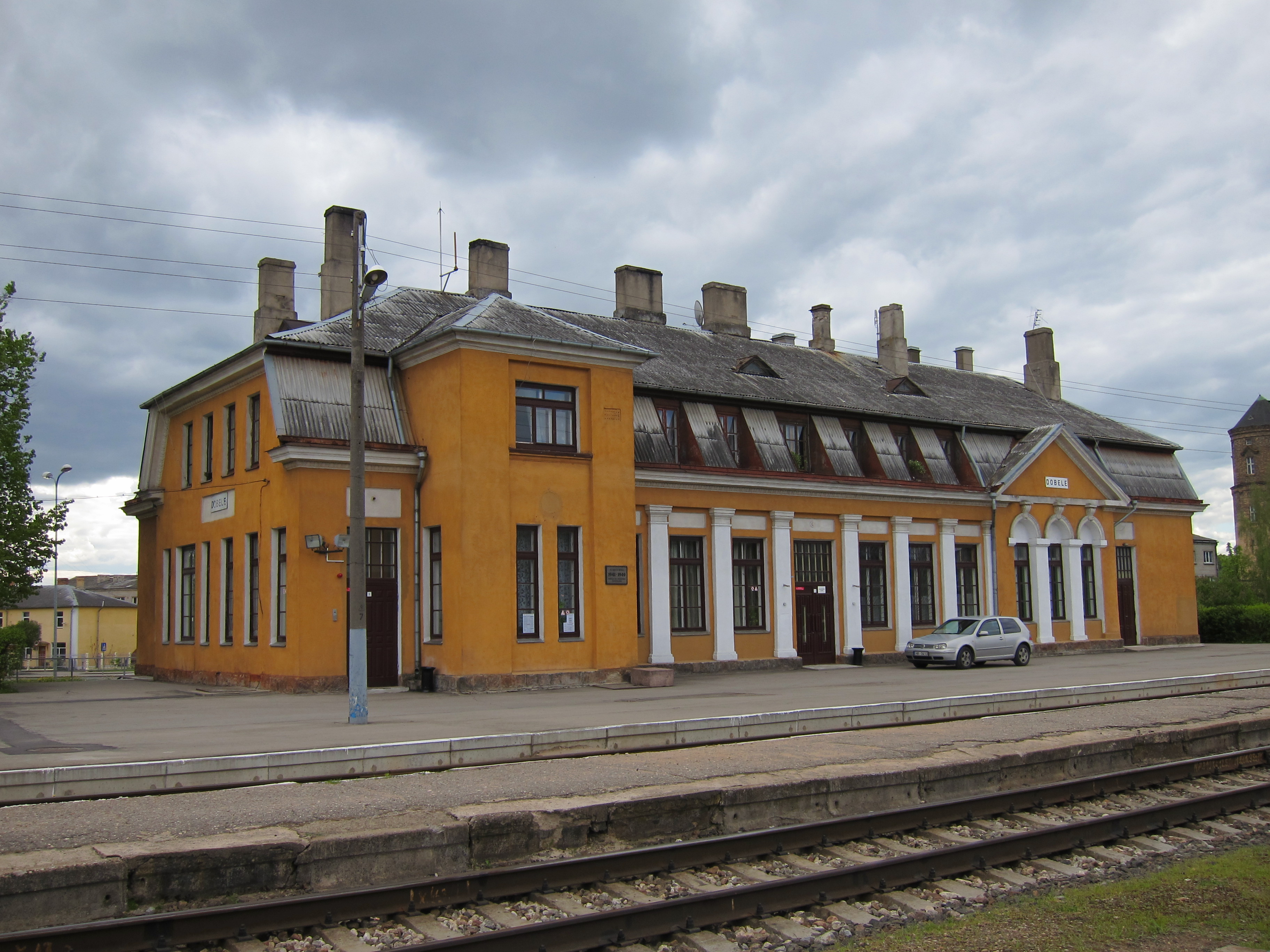
Platform facade of the station building

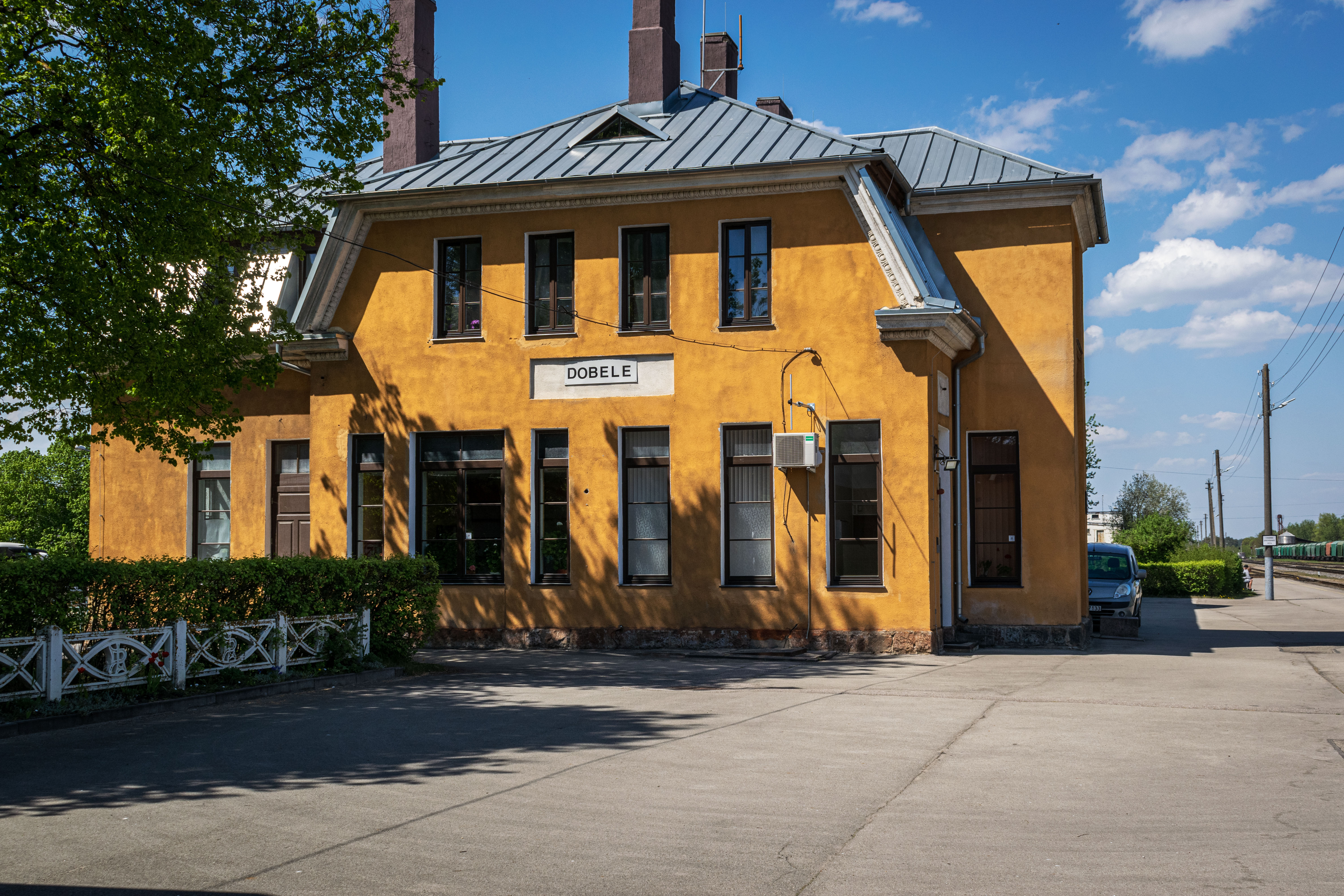
Side facade of the station building

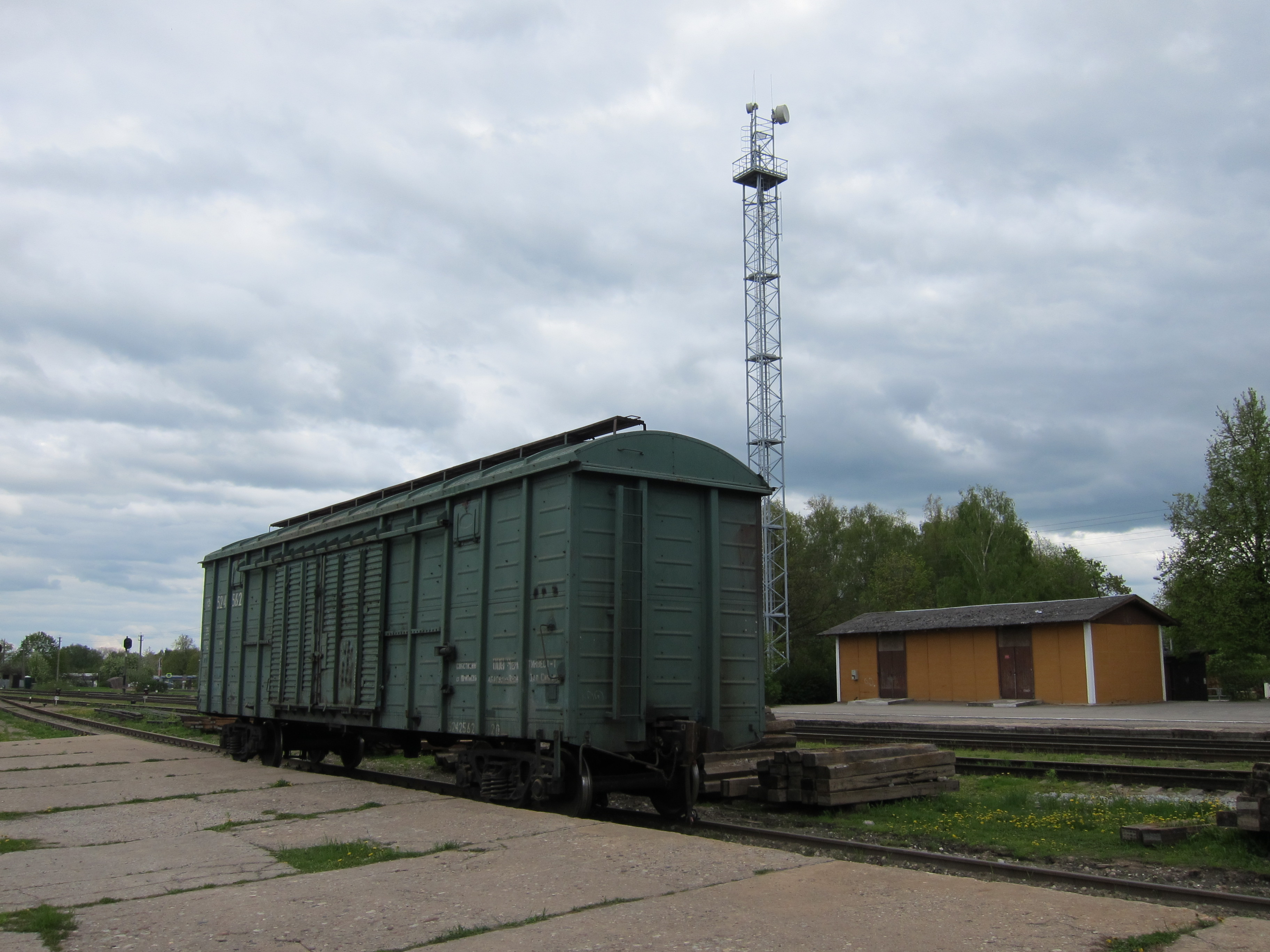
Freight wagon at Dobele station

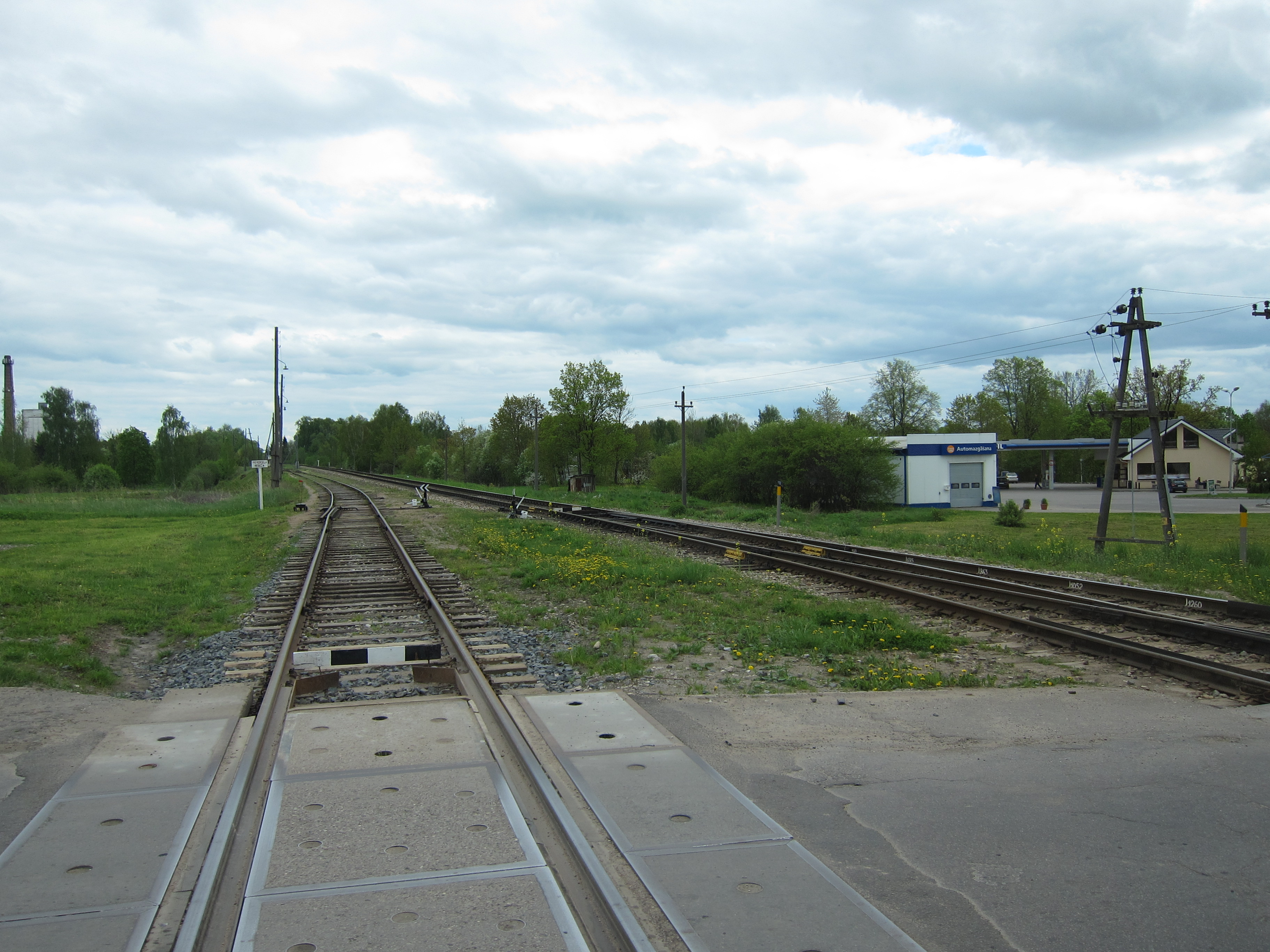
Tracks in the direction of Jelgava

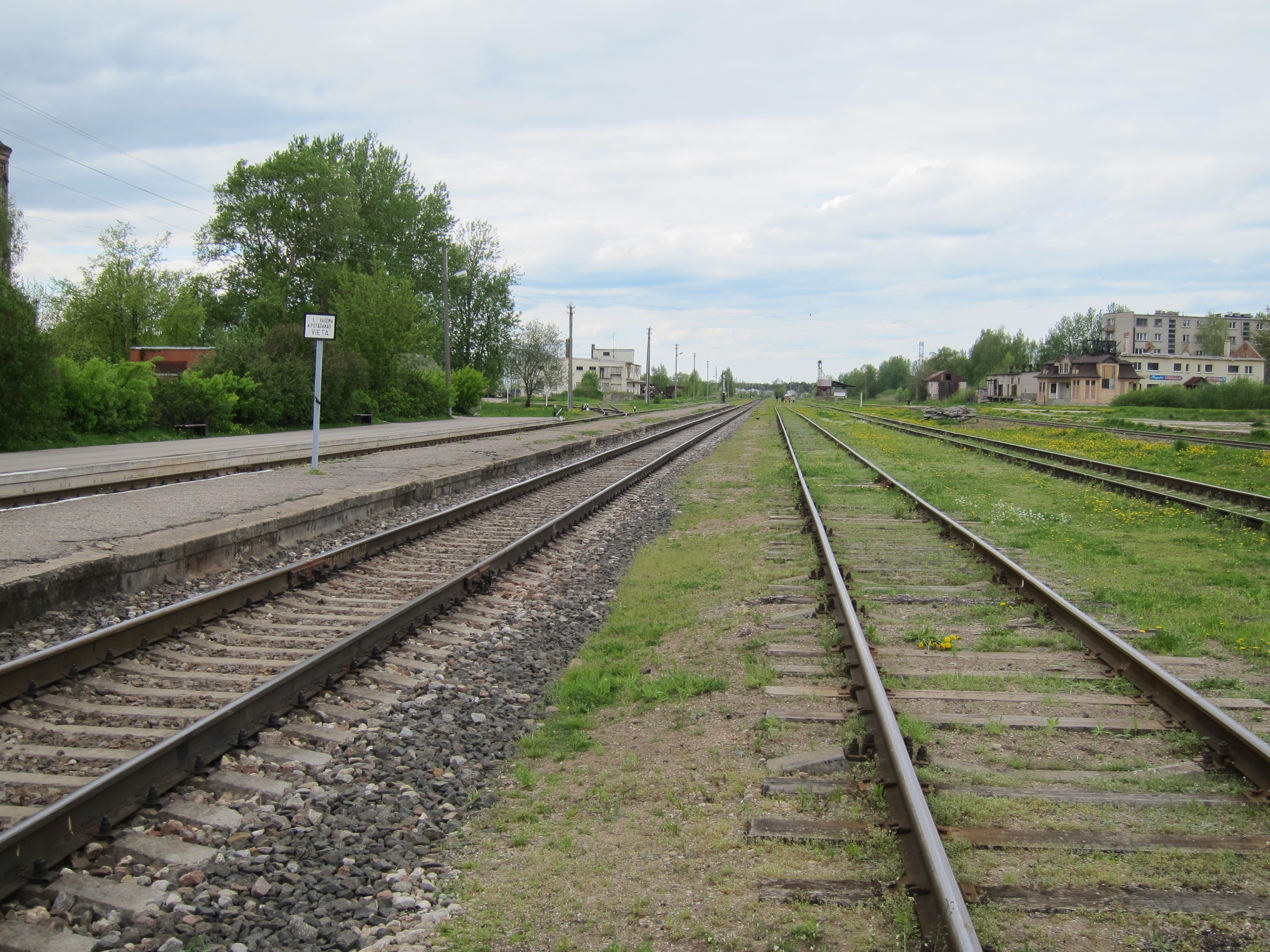
Tracks in the direction of Liepāja

== See also ==
- Transport in Latvia
- Rail transport in Latvia
- History of rail transport in Latvia
