= Bikstu stacija =

Village in Latvia, center of Biksti Parish, Dobele Municipality

Coordinates: 56.6908°N 22.9797°E

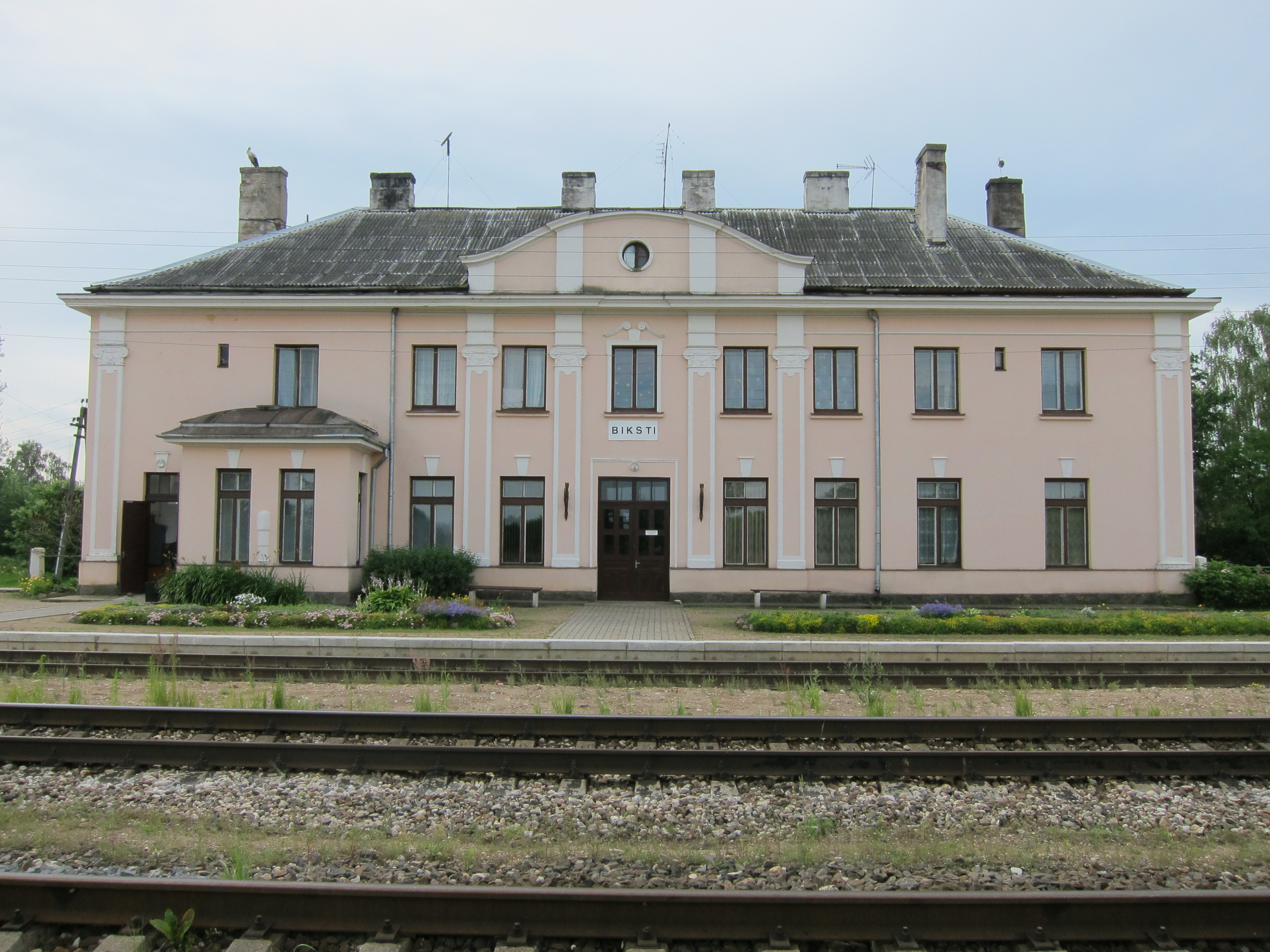
Biksti Railway Station building and tracks

Bikstu stacija is a village and the center of Biksti Parish of Dobele Municipality. The settlement grew around the Biksti Railway Station on the Jelgava–Liepāja Railway. It is also located in the Semigallia region of Latvia, and the Zemgale Planning Region.
