= Skrunda Station =

Railway station in Latvia

Skrunda

General information
- Location: Stacijas iela 1, Skrunda, Skrunda Municipality
- Coordinates: 56°40′49.20″N 22°0′43.52″E
- Line: Jelgava – Liepāja Railway
- Platforms: 1
- Tracks: 4

History
- Opened: 1928

Services
Preceding station	LDz	Following station
Saldus towards Jelgava	Jelgava–Liepāja	Liepāja Terminus
Location

Skrunda Station is a railway station on the Jelgava – Liepāja Railway.
