= Viesturi Station =

Railway station in Latvia

Viesturi

General information
- Location: "Viesturu mājas" Glūda Parish, Jelgava Municipality; Latvia
- Coordinates: 56°36′55.11″N 23°35′7.31″E
- Owner: Latvian Railways
- Line: Jelgava – Liepāja Railway
- Platforms: 2
- Tracks: 2

History
- Opened: 1925
- Former names: Tērvete
Location
- Location within Latvia

Viesturi Station is a closed railway station on the Jelgava – Liepāja Railway. Opened in 1925 as Tērvete, it was renamed Viesturi in 1935.

The station was gradually being phased out of service since 2001, and was ultimately closed in December 2015. Since then, the station buildings and infrastructure, owned by Latvian Railways, have been conserved.

A nearby summer home settlement called Viesturciems has been established close to the station. In 2024, the residents of Viesturciems gathered signatures to ask for the station to be brought back in service.
