= Liepāja–Priekule Railway =

Railway in Latvia

Overview
- Termini: Liepāja Station; Priekule Station

Service
- Operator(s): Latvian Railways

History
- Opened: 1871

Technical
- Line length: 40 km (24.85 mi)
- Track gauge: 1,524 mm (5 ft)

The Liepāja–Priekule Railway is a 40 kilometres (25 mi) long, 1,524 mm (5 ft) gauge railway built in the 19th century to connect Liepāja (in Western Latvia) and Kaišiadorys (in central Lithuania). Currently, the railway line is closed for traffic.
