= Padone Station =

Railway station in Latvia

General information
- Coordinates: 56°33′50.85″N 21°27′33.16″E
- Line: Jelgava–Liepāja Railway
- Tracks: 1
- Connections: passenger

History
- Opened: 1930
- Closed: 2001
Location

Padone Station was a railway station on the Jelgava – Liepāja Railway.

== History ==
Padone Station was opened in 1930, shortly after the opening of the Jelgava – Liepāja Railway. Initially, a wagon was used for passenger needs, but the station building in Padone was built in 1939 (architect Jānis Šarlovs). In 1945, there was a station with four switches here. The diesel train Riga–Liepāja have been stopped at Padone Station until June 15, 2001. Since 2001, this station has been unused. The station has been demolished today.
