= Durbe Station =

Railway station in Latvia

Durbe

General information
- Coordinates: 56°33′32.21″N 21°24′51.40″E
Location

Durbe Station is a railway station on the Jelgava – Liepāja Railway.
