= Kalvene Station =

Railway station in Latvia

Kalvene

General information
- Coordinates: 56°37′13.72″N 21°41′33.45″E
Location

Kalvene Station is a railway station on the Jelgava – Liepāja Railway.
