= Ilmāja Station =

Railway station in Latvia

Ilmāja
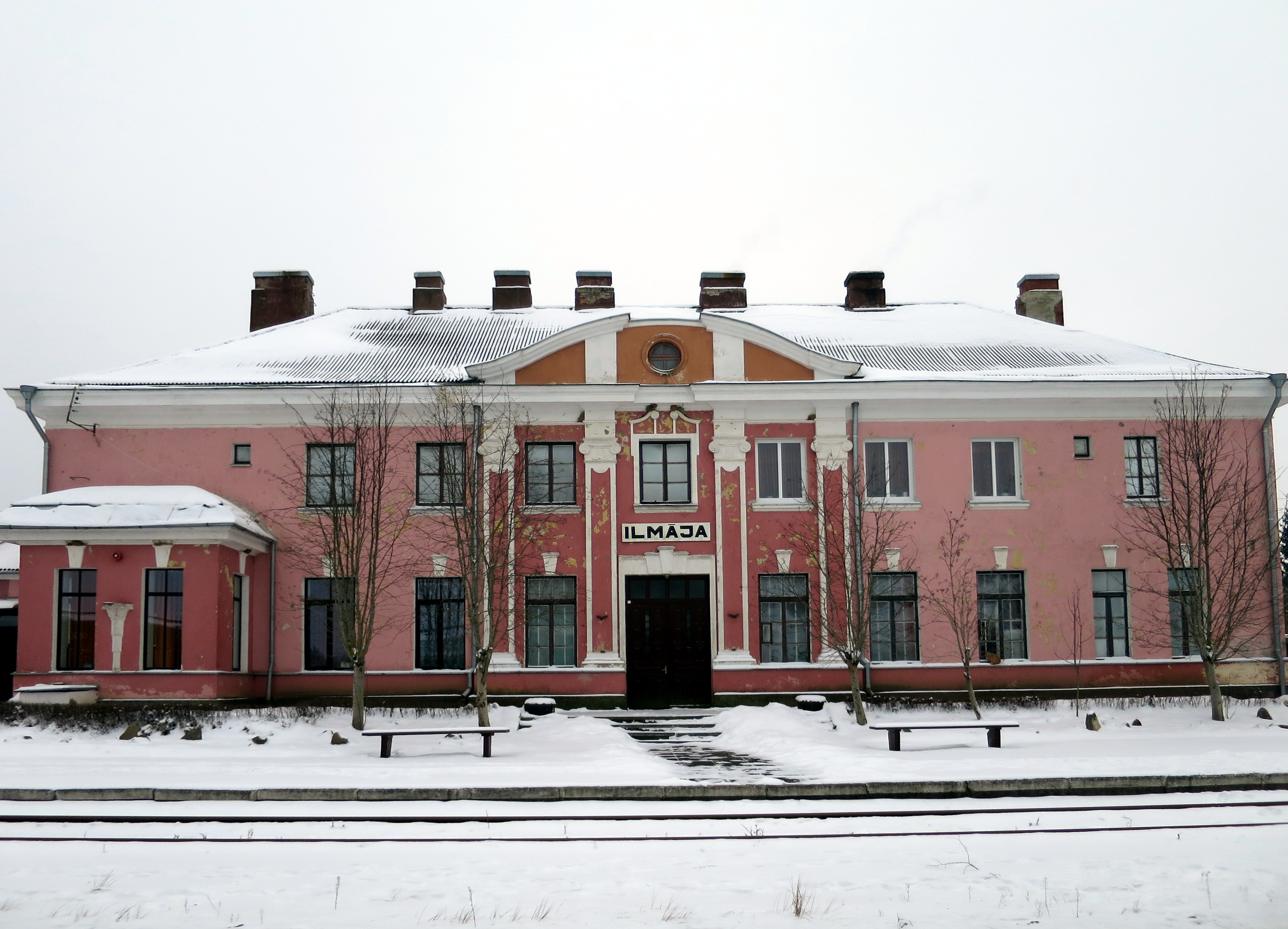

General information
- Coordinates: 56°34′30.85″N 21°33′2.54″E
Location

Ilmāja Station is a railway station on the Jelgava – Liepāja Railway.
