= Biksti Manor =

Manor house in Latvia

- Semigallia, Latvia
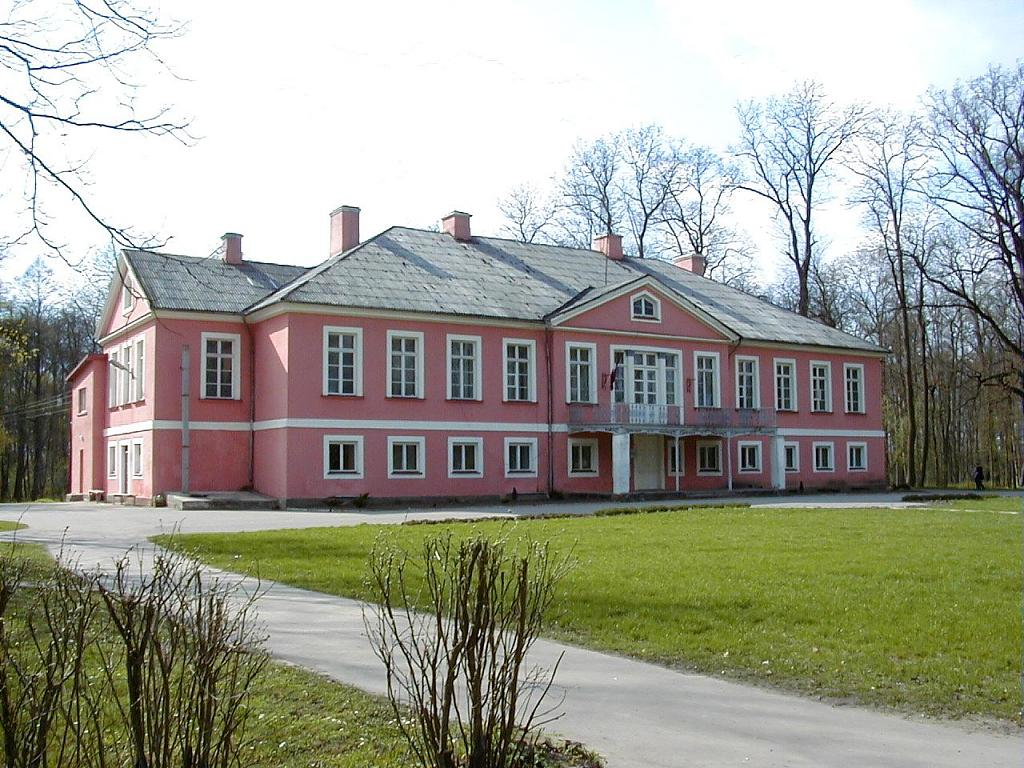

Site information
- Type: Manor

Location
- Coordinates: 56°41′35.5″N 22°58′08.9″E

Site history
- Built: 1847

Biksti Manor (Latvian: Bikstu muiža) is a manor house located in the Biksti Parish of Dobele Municipality in the Semigallia region of Latvia. A two-story building constructed in rectangular shape, the estate comprises a large landscape park with rare species of trees. The manor currently houses the Biksti Elementary School.

== History ==
Since 1795 manor was owned by Ropp noble family. After Latvian Agrarian Reform of 1920s family loses manor and leaves in 1927. Since 1922 new owner of estate - Agricultural Society - leased manor house and land to von Lieven family. In 1940 the von Lieven family emigrates, but the eldest family members, who stayed put at manor has been deported to Siberia. Since 1945 till present day there is a school at manor house.

Manor house with elements of neo-gothic style in its architecture was built in 1847. Later it was rebuilt resulting in loss of original look and proportions. Today building visibly displays classical forms. There are a lot of very valuable interior components preserved in the manor interior, such as furnaces, the heating systems, wood siding, trim and stair railings, iron balcony railings and pillars.

== See also ==
- List of palaces and manor houses in Latvia
