= Tadaiķi Station =

Railway station in Latvia

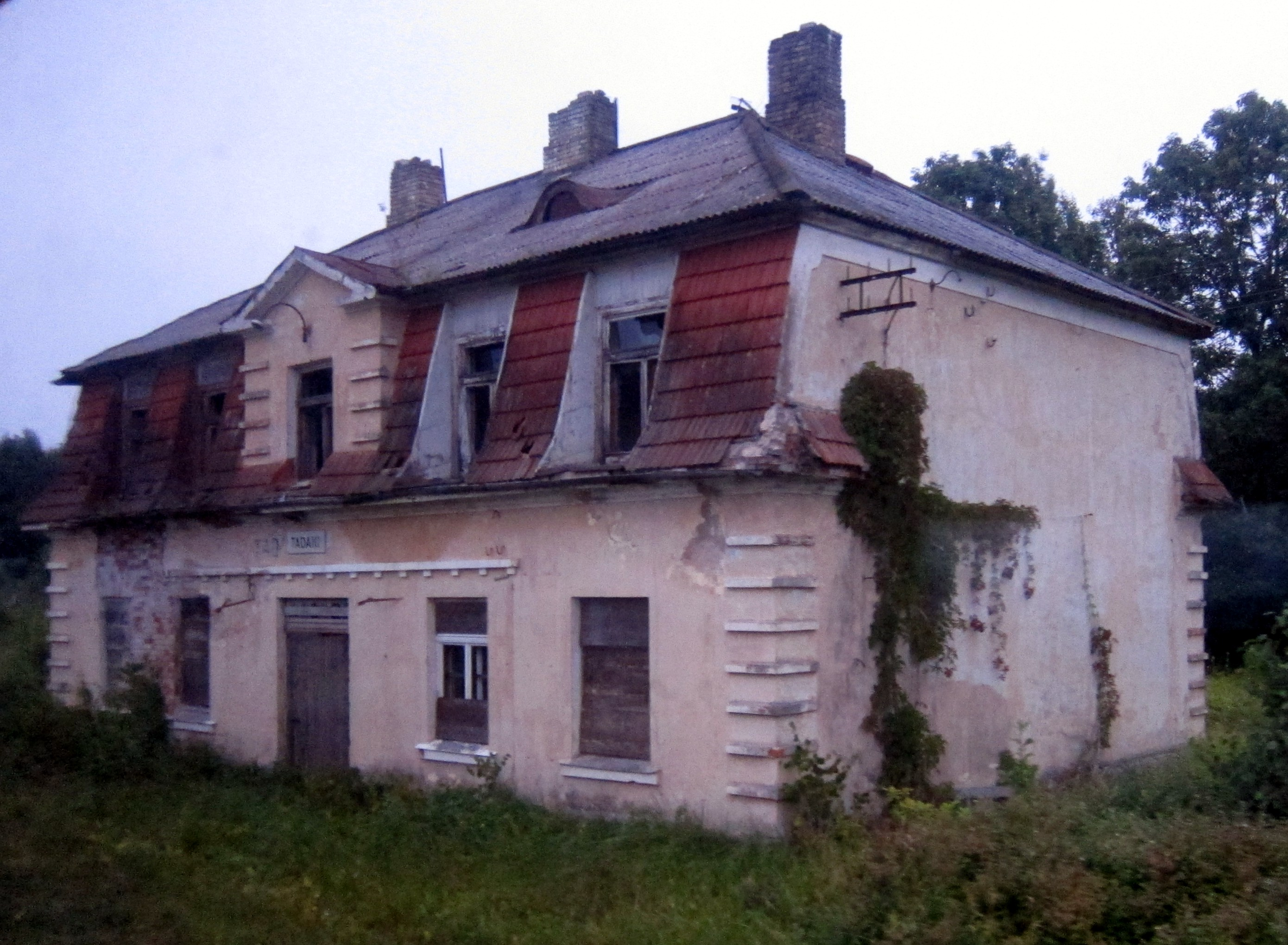
- Badly damaged station building

General information
- Coordinates: 56°32′56.10″N 21°21′55.27″E

History
- Opened: 1930
- Closed: 2001
Location

Tadaiķi Station is a railway station on the Jelgava – Liepāja Railway.
