= Josta Station =

Railway station in Latvia

Josta

General information
- Coordinates: 56°41′29.76″N 22°51′12.24″E
Location

Josta Station is a railway station on the Jelgava – Liepāja Railway in Latvia.
