= Reņģe Manor =

Manor house in Latvia

- Semigallia, Latvia
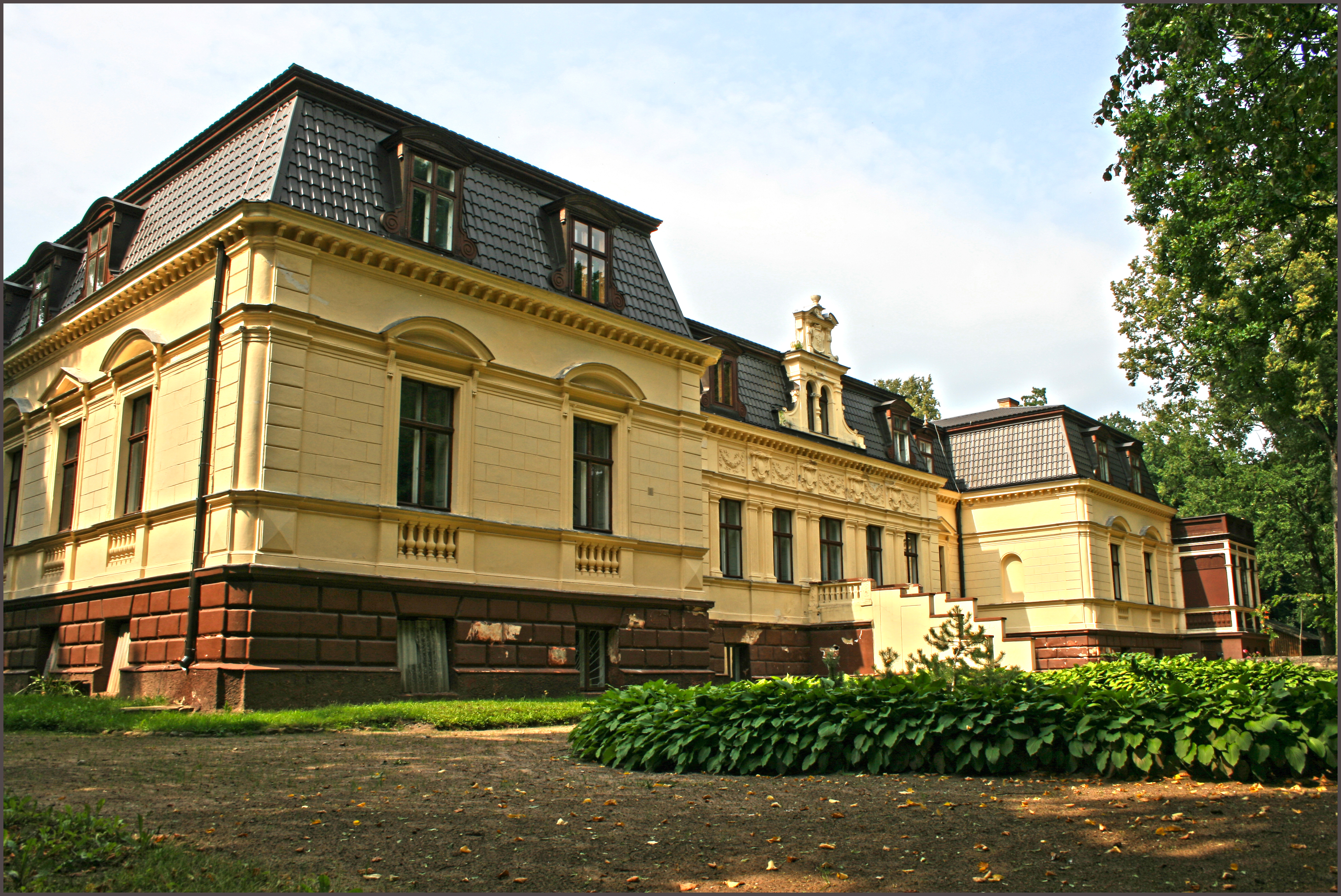

Site information
- Type: Manor

Location
- Coordinates: 56°23′05″N 22°38′29″E

Site history
- Built: 1881-1882

Reņģe Manor (Latvian: Reņģes muižas pils, German: Ringen), also called Ruba Manor, is a manor house for the von Nolcken family that was built between 1881 and 1882 in the Ruba Parish of Saldus Municipality in the Semigallia region of Latvia. It is located about 2.5 km west of both the village of Ruba and the railroad bridge where the Glūda–Reņģe Railway crosses the Vadakste river along the border of Latvia and Lithuania. Manor building currently houses the Ruba Elementary School.

== History ==
The first owner of the Rubas or Reņģe manor was Rotger von Ashberg, who, following the collapse of the Livonian Order in 1574, acquired the land here. Wilhelm von Ashberg, who in the 18th century. He inherited the manor in the 2nd half and sold it to his brother Christoph in 1789. In 1794, when Wilhelm, after his marriage to Countess Theresa Kettler, also became the owner of the Ezere Manor, she exchanged the Ezere Manor with the Bruzilu Manor (Latvian: Bruzilu muižu German: Gut Bresilgen), which belonged to the Ezere Manor. When the manor of Lake Ezera was bought by Baron von Stieglitz, a wealthy Russian man, in 1835, Rügen became his property. In 1879, Voldemar von Nolken, son of Gustav von Nolken, the then Baron of the Lake, became the owner of Reņģe Manor (later he adopted the title of Count von Reiter). His son, Count Michael, the last owner of the Reņģe Manor, joined Baltische Landeswehr and fell in 1919 fighting with the Bolsheviks. Since then and till Latvian Agrarian reform of the 1920s estate was property of the Baron von Nolken family.

The Manor main building, which has survived to the present day, was built during the time of Baron Voldemar von Nolken (1881-1882). The project was designed by architects Reinhold von Sivers and Max Schervink. The latter, he thought, also designed the building's luxurious interiors. The castle is a one-story brick building with basement and attic construction. At present, the decorative finishes of the palace interior as well as several stoves and fireplaces have been preserved. Not far from the castle, beside the farm buildings there is a peculiar manor water tower, built in 1882.

== See also ==
- List of palaces and manor houses in Latvia
