= Līvi, Dobele Municipality =

Village in Latvia

Coordinates: 56.6931°N 22.9667°E

Līvi is a village in the Biksti Parish of Dobele Municipality in the Semigallia region and the Zemgale Planning Region in Latvia.
