= Glūda–Reņģe Railway =

Railway in Latvia

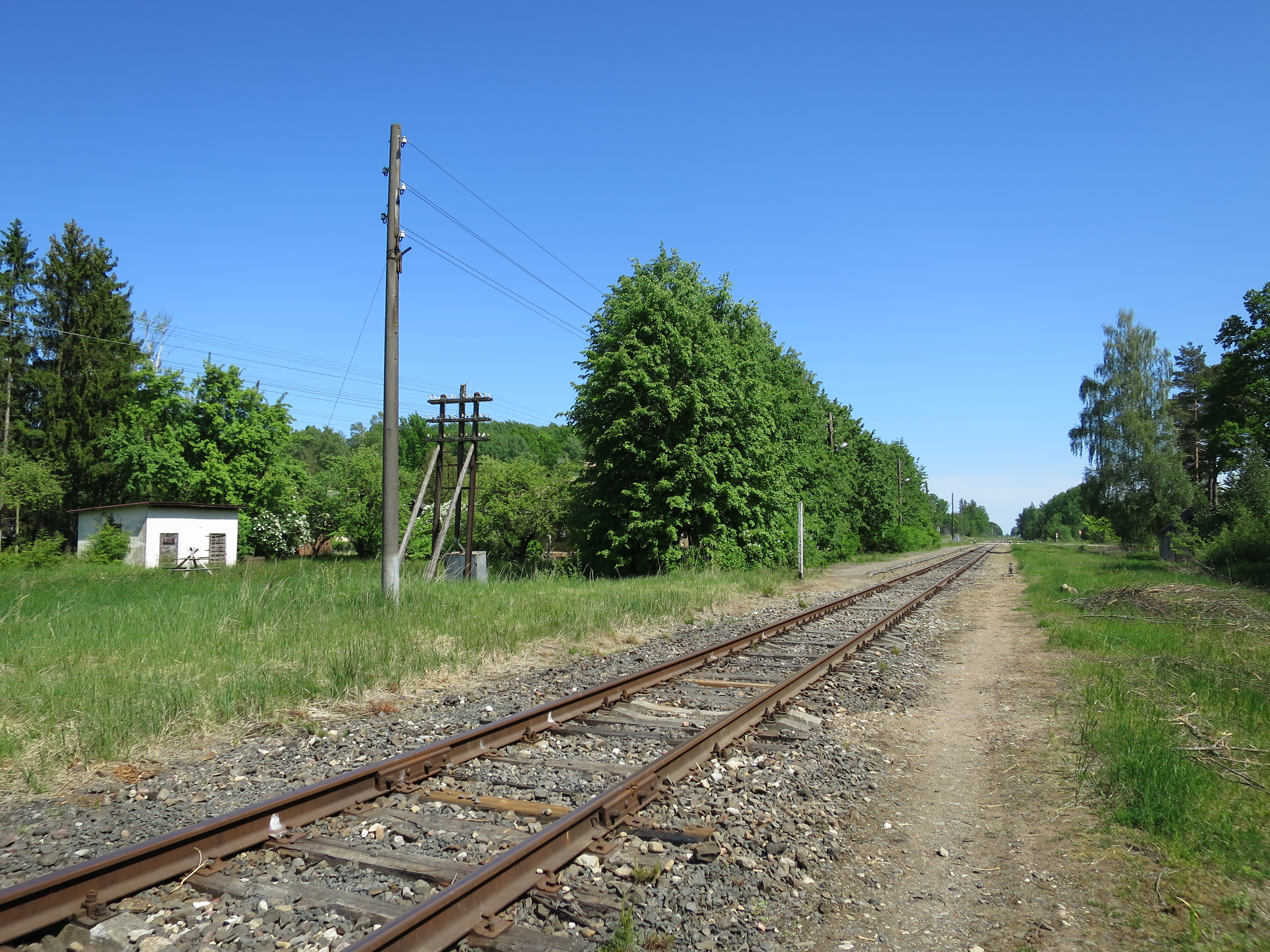

Overview
- Termini: Glūda Station; Reņģe Station

Service
- Operator(s): Latvian Railways

History
- Opened: 1873

Technical
- Line length: 60 km (37.28 mi)
- Track gauge: 1,524 mm (5 ft)

The Glūda–Reņģe Railway is a 60 kilometres (37 mi) long, 1,524 mm (5 ft) gauge railway built in the 19th century to connect Jelgava and Mažeikiai.

== See also ==
Railway lines in Latvia in 2016.

- Rail transport in Latvia
- History of rail transport in Latvia

== Bibliography ==
- Altbergs, T.; Augustāne, K.; Pētersone, I. (2009). Dzelzceļi Latvijā [Railways in Latvia] (in Latvian). Jumava. ISBN 978-9984-38-698-0.
