= Jaunā māja =

Village in Dobele Municipality, Latvia

Coordinates: 56.7011°N 22.9478°E

Jaunā māja is a village in the Biksti Parish of Dobele Municipality in the Semigallia region of Latvia and the Zemgale Planning Region.
