= Latvian Railway History Museum =

Museum in Riga and Jelgava, Latvia

- Latvijas dzelzceļa vēstures muzejs
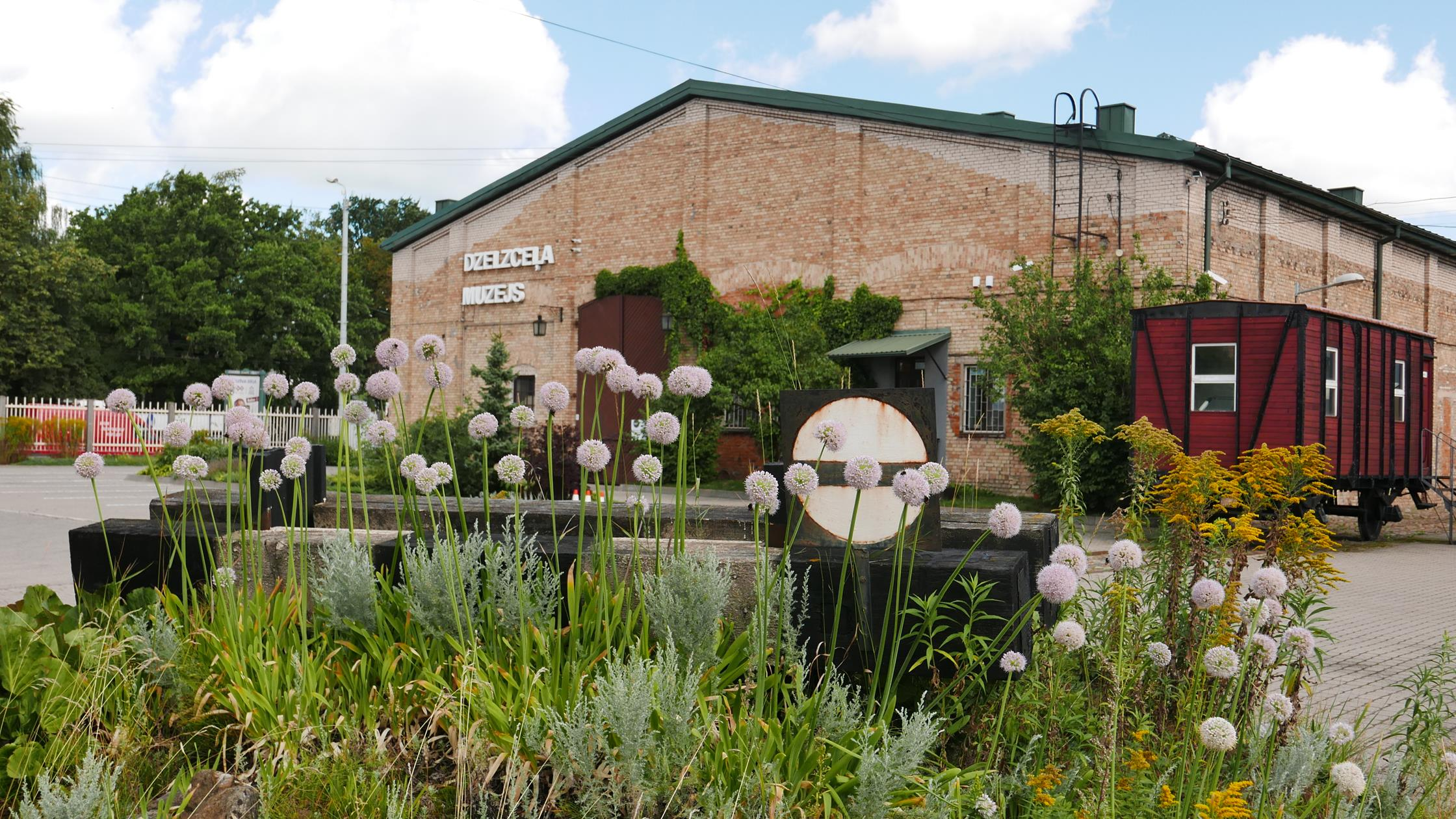
- Railway Museum building in Riga
- Established: 30 August 1994
- Location: Pārdaugava, Riga, Latvia
- Coordinates: 56°56′27.24″N 24°5′40.2″E
- Type: Transport museum
- Key holdings: ER2 electric trainset, TEM2, TE, ТГМ3
- Owner: Latvijas dzelzceļš
- Website: www.railwaymuseum.lv/en

Latvian Railway History Museum (Latvian: Latvijas dzelzceļa vēstures muzejs) is a railway museum with expositions in Riga and in Jelgava, dedicated to the history of railway and its development in Latvia. The museum is a structural unit of the national railroad company, "Latvijas dzelzceļš". The museum has the largest collection of wide-gauge vehicles in the Baltics.

== Museum in Riga ==
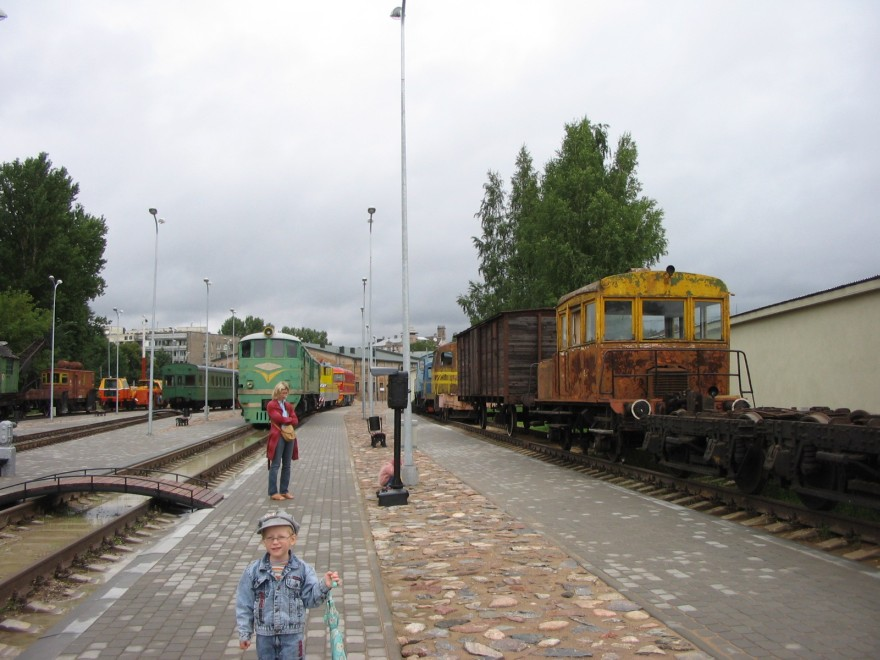
Exposition of locomotives in the Latvian Railway History Museus

The main branch of the museum is located in Riga and is housed in a locomotive repair shop, and also hosts events and concerts in an 1880s locomotive depot, both located in the Pārdaugava district of the city, near the main building of the National Library of Latvia known as Castle of Light. It was established on August 30, 1994, and contains more than a thousand railway-related items. Samples of uniforms, tickets, train schedules and other things related to the Latvian Railway can be seen in the exhibits. Outside the museum premises, railway rolling stock can be seen - locomotives, wagons and other railway equipment operating in Latvia. The museum has a resident cat, named Pearl.

== Jelgava Museum exposition ==
The Jelgava branch of the museum was opened on 24 December 1982, when the Jelgava Railway Department's Open Achievement Museum was opened in the Jelgava Railway Club. In 1991, the Railway Museum moved to the railwaymen's residential house, which was built in 1903 and is located near Jelgava railway station. The exposition includes semaphores, couplings, trolleys, locomotive wheelsets, hydrant, level crossing equipment and other things related to Latvian Railways.
