= Mazbiksti =

Village in Latvia

Coordinates: 56.6828°N 22.9553°E

Mazbiksti is a village in the Biksti Parish of Dobele Municipality in the Semigallia region and the Zemgale Planning Region in Latvia.
