= Glūda Station =

Railway station in Latvia

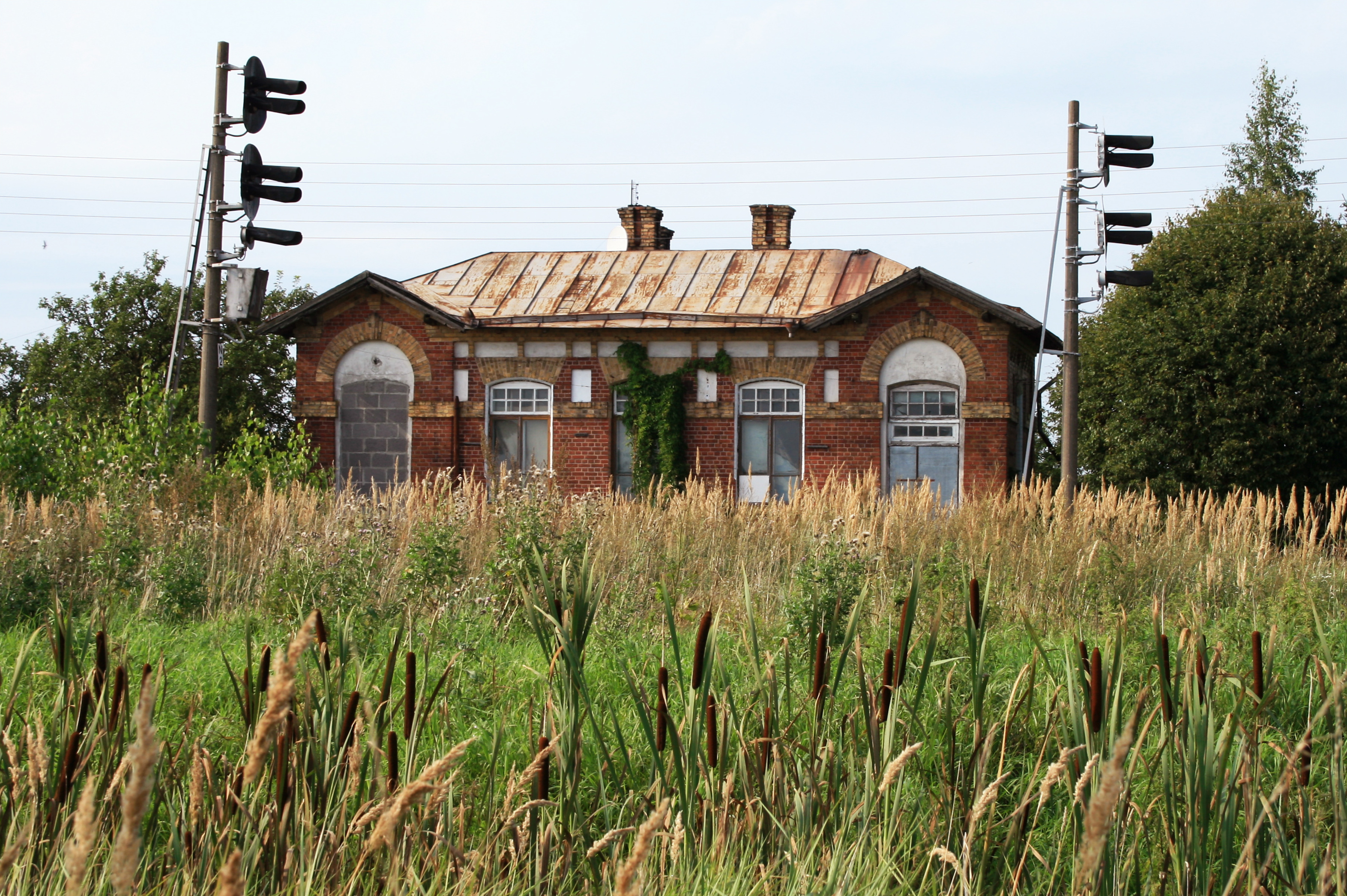

General information
- Location: Glūda; Glūda parish, Jelgava Municipality; Latvia
- Coordinates: 56°35′53.29″N 23°29′7.65″E
- Platforms: 1

History
- Opened: 1887
- Former names: Pfalzgrafen
Location
- Location within Latvia

Glūda Station is a junction railway station in the village of Glūda in the Semigallia region of southern Latvia. The station is a railway junction where the Jelgava – Liepāja and Glūda–Reņģe railways meet. Trains do no longer stop at the station.
