= Biksti =

Center of Biksti Parish, Dobele Municipality, Latvia

Coordinates: 56°42′N 22°58′E

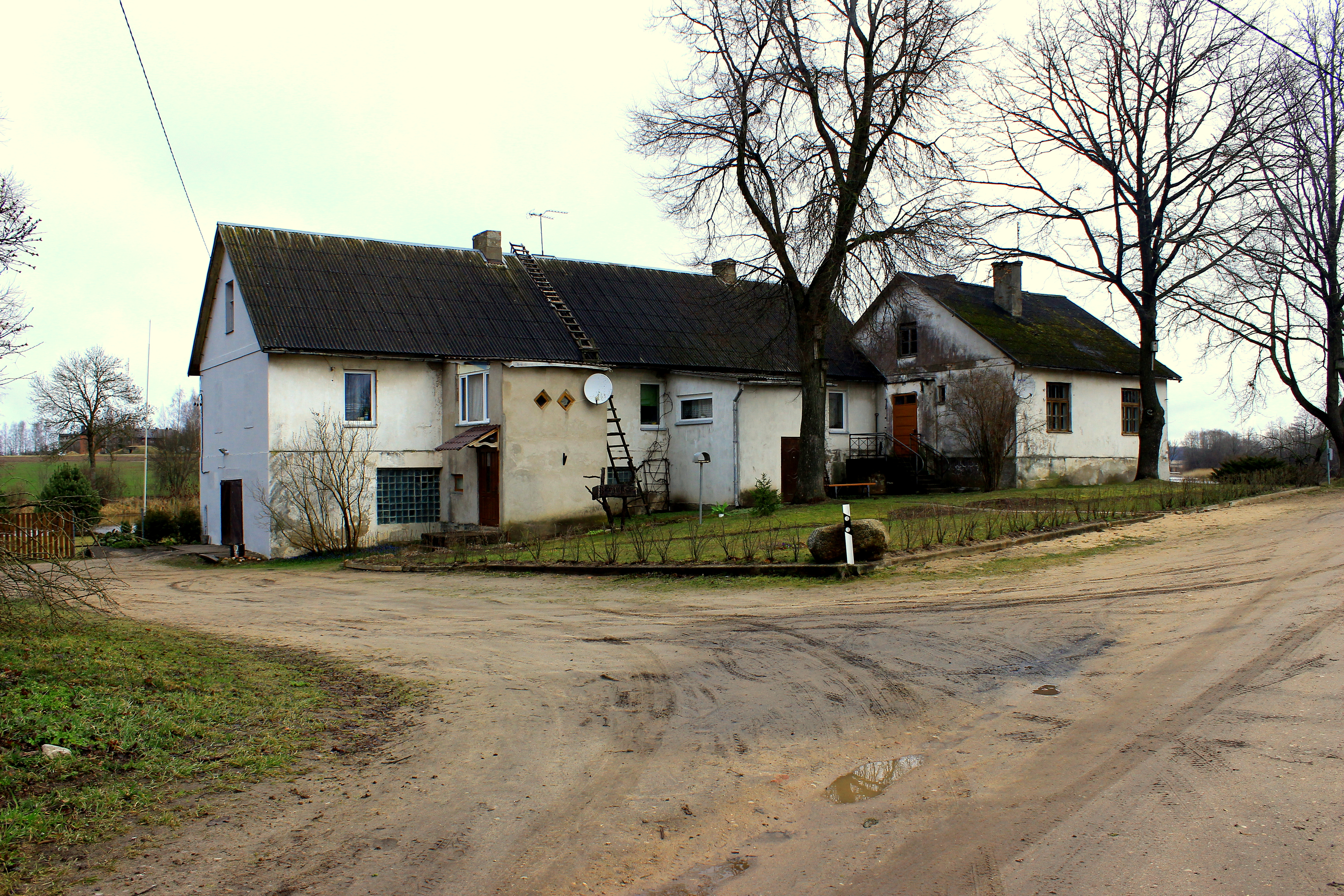
A homestead in Biksti

Biksti (German: Bixten) is a Latvian village in the Biksti Parish of Dobele Municipality in the Semigallia region and the Zemgale Planning Region.
