= Sieksāte Station =

Railway station in Latvia

Sieksāte

General information
- Coordinates: 56°40′54.72″N 21°55′50.75″E
Location

Sieksāte Station is a railway station on the Jelgava – Liepāja Railway.
