= Upenieki, Biksti Parish =

Villalge in Latvia

Coordinates: 56.6581°N 22.9006°E

Upenieki is a village in the Biksti Parish of Dobele Municipality in the Semigallia region of Latvia and the Zemgale Planning Region.
