= Rudbārži Station =

Railway station in Latvia

Rudbārži

General information
- Coordinates: 56°39′10.55″N 21°49′33.32″E
Location

Rudbārži Station is a railway station on the Jelgava – Liepāja Railway.
