= Biksti Parish =

Parish of Latvia

- parish of Latvia
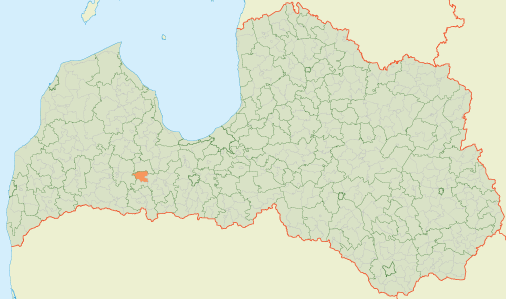
- 56°40′23″N 22°56′09″E
- Country: Latvia

Area
  - Total: 96.01 km^{2} (37.07 sq mi)
  - Land: 89.92 km^{2} (34.72 sq mi)
  - Water: 6.09 km^{2} (2.35 sq mi)

Population (1 January 2026)
  - Total: 713
  - Density: 7.93/km^{2} (20.5/sq mi)

Biksti Parish (Latvian: Bikstu pagasts) is an administrative unit of Dobele Municipality in the Semigallia region of Latvia.

== Towns, villages and settlements of Biksti Parish ==
- Biksti
- Bikstu Stacija
- Jaunā Māja
- Līvi
- Mazbiksti
- Upenieki
