= Latvian Railways =

State-owned railway company in Latvia

Latvijas dzelzceļš

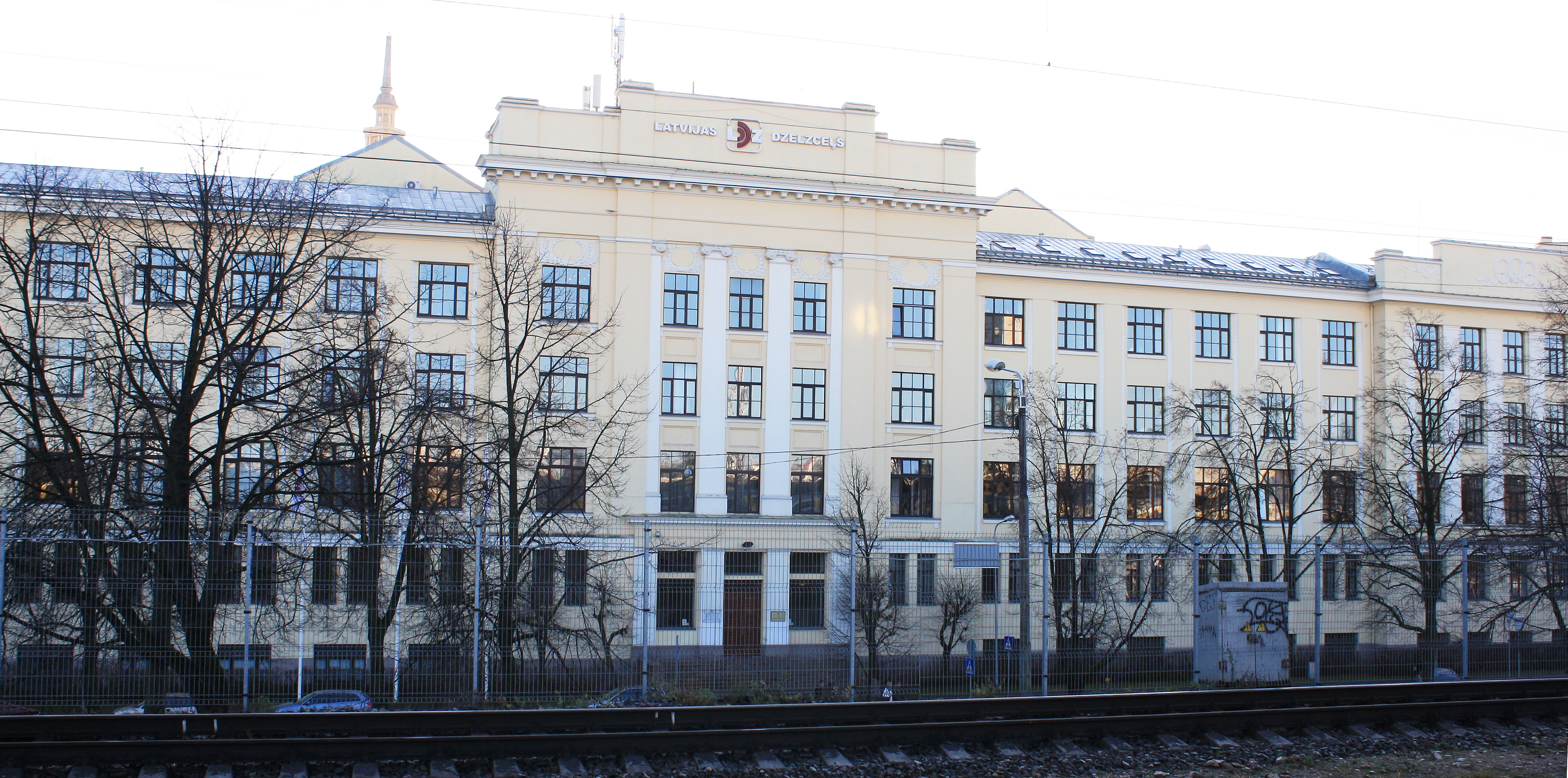
- Latvian Railways office
- Company type: State-owned joint-stock company
- Industry: Transport, transit, logistics
- Founded: August 5, 1919; 106 years ago (re-founded October 1, 1991; 34 years ago)
- Headquarters: Rīga, Latvia
- Key people: Artis Grinbergs (Management Board Chairman)
- Revenue: EUR 183,3 million (2019)
- Net income: EUR 32 430 (2019)
- Total assets: 784,634,904 (2023)
- Number of employees: 9950 (Group), 6265 (JSC Latvijas dzelzceļš ) as of 31 December 2019.
- Parent: Government of Latvia
- Website: ldz.lv

Latvijas dzelzceļš (English: Latvian Railway, abbr. LDz) is the state-owned company responsible for managing the public railway infrastructure in Latvia. It is fully owned by the Latvian government, with all shares held by the Republic of Latvia; the holder of the state shares is the Latvian Ministry of Transport. Latvijas dzelzceļš was founded on 2 September 1991 and is considered the successor of the Latvian State Railways (Latvian: Latvijas valsts dzelzceļi) company which was established on 5 August 1919 and dissolved by the Soviet occupation of Latvia in 1940.

Latvijas dzelzceļš is the controlling company of the Latvijas dzelzceļš Group, and provides a range of services, including the management of public railway infrastructure, service facility operations (freight wagon assembly handling, wagon maintenance and inspection, maintenance and development of passenger stations and stops), electricity distribution and trade, real estate rental, information technology, electronic communications, as well as other principal services.

The Latvijas dzelzceļš Group includes the parent company – state joint-stock company Latvijas dzelzceļš, and six subsidiaries:

- SIA LDZ CARGO – operates rail cargo and international passenger transport;
- SIA LDZ Loģistika – logistics and multimodal transport services company;
- SIA LDZ Infrastruktūra – infrastructure construction and maintenance company;
- SIA LDZ Ritošā Sastāva Serviss – rolling stock repair and maintenance company;
- SIA LDZ Apsardze – security service company;
- Joint-stock LatRailNet – determines the infrastructure tariff and the allocation of railway infrastructure capacity.

LDz also operates the Latvian Rail History Museum, with exhibitions both in Riga and Jelgava.

== Railway history of Latvia until 1991 ==
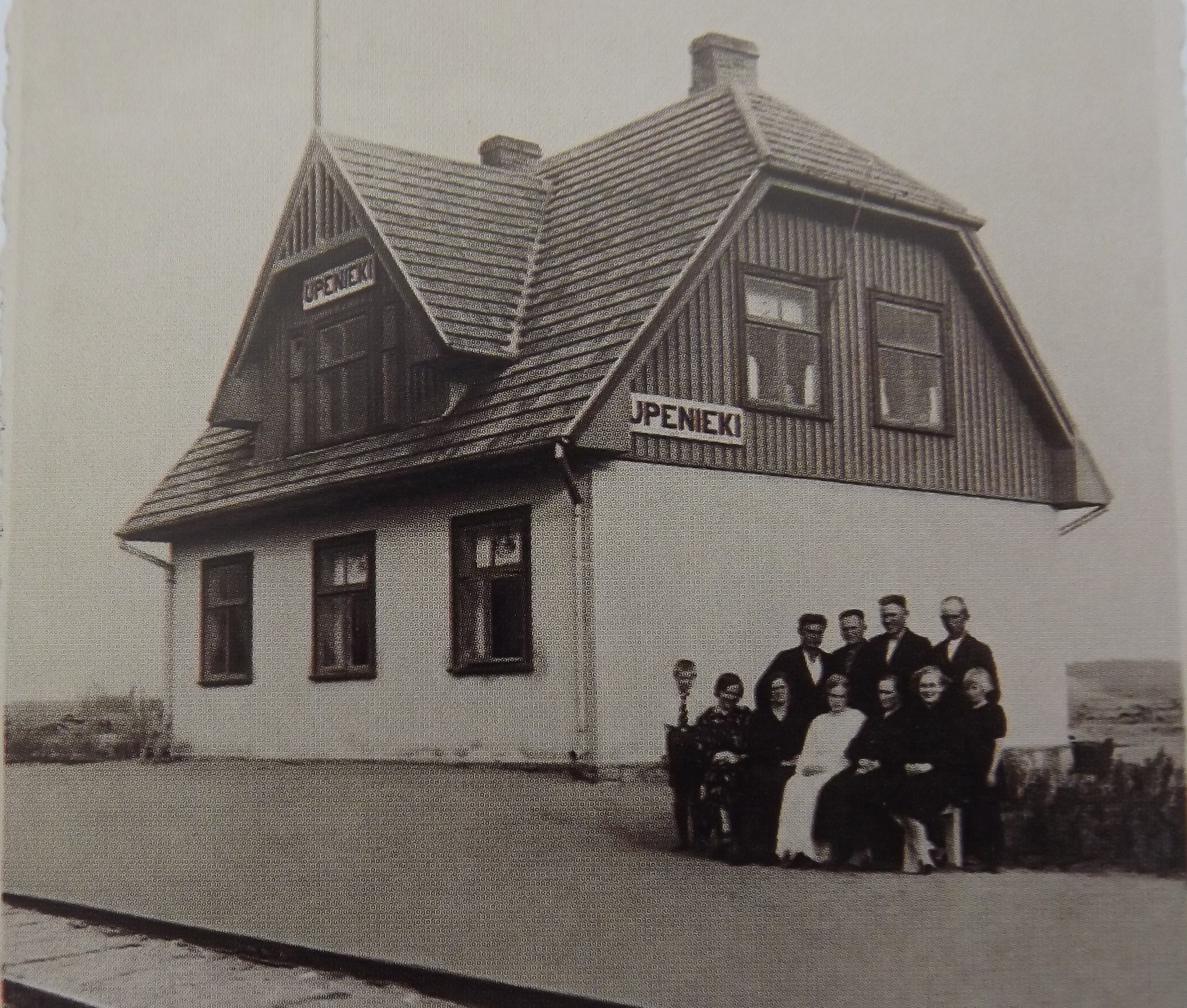
Upenieki train stop (then – Tukuma apriņķis), 1938

On September 12, 1861, the first independent railway line in the territory of Latvia, which connected Riga with Daugavpils, was handed over for general use. On 15 December 1862, the construction of the railway between St. Petersburg and Warsaw was completed, creating the first railway junction in Latvian territory, in the state city (Latvian: valstspilsēta, "state city") of Daugavpils. By 1880, 800 kilometres (500 mi) of rail-lines had been built in Latvia.

In the period up to 1900, in parallel with the construction of new state-funded railways, the previously built private railways were bought out and concentrated within state-run structures. At this point the Riga-Oryol Railway Administration became the largest railway operator in the territory of Latvia, with 500 kilometres (310 mi) of railway lines transferred to its management. The other railways were supervised by the Russian Northwestern Railway and the Liepāja – Romna Railway administrations. In 1904, the 1,094-kilometre-long (680 mi) Moscow–Ventspils Railroad was put into operation, extending approximately 165 kilometres (103 mi) past Riga to the port of Ventspils, with a significant part of the new line – between Zilupe and Ventspils, a length of 456 kilometres (283 mi) – being located in the territory of Latvia. Consequently, all major Latvian ports were connected with major inland processors and markets by railway lines, and remain so today. At the beginning of the 20th century, large-scale reconstruction works of the Riga railway junction began. New railway stations and connecting lines were built, and a new bridge over the Daugava River at Riga was constructed (see Riga Railway Bridge). However, the reconstruction of the Riga passenger station was not completed due to the beginning of the First World War.

World War I and the Latvian War of Independence caused significant damage to railway infrastructure, but the total length of railway lines in the four years of the war increased from 1,941 to 2,763 kilometres (1,206 to 1,717 mi), mainly due to construction of narrow-gauge railways for military use.

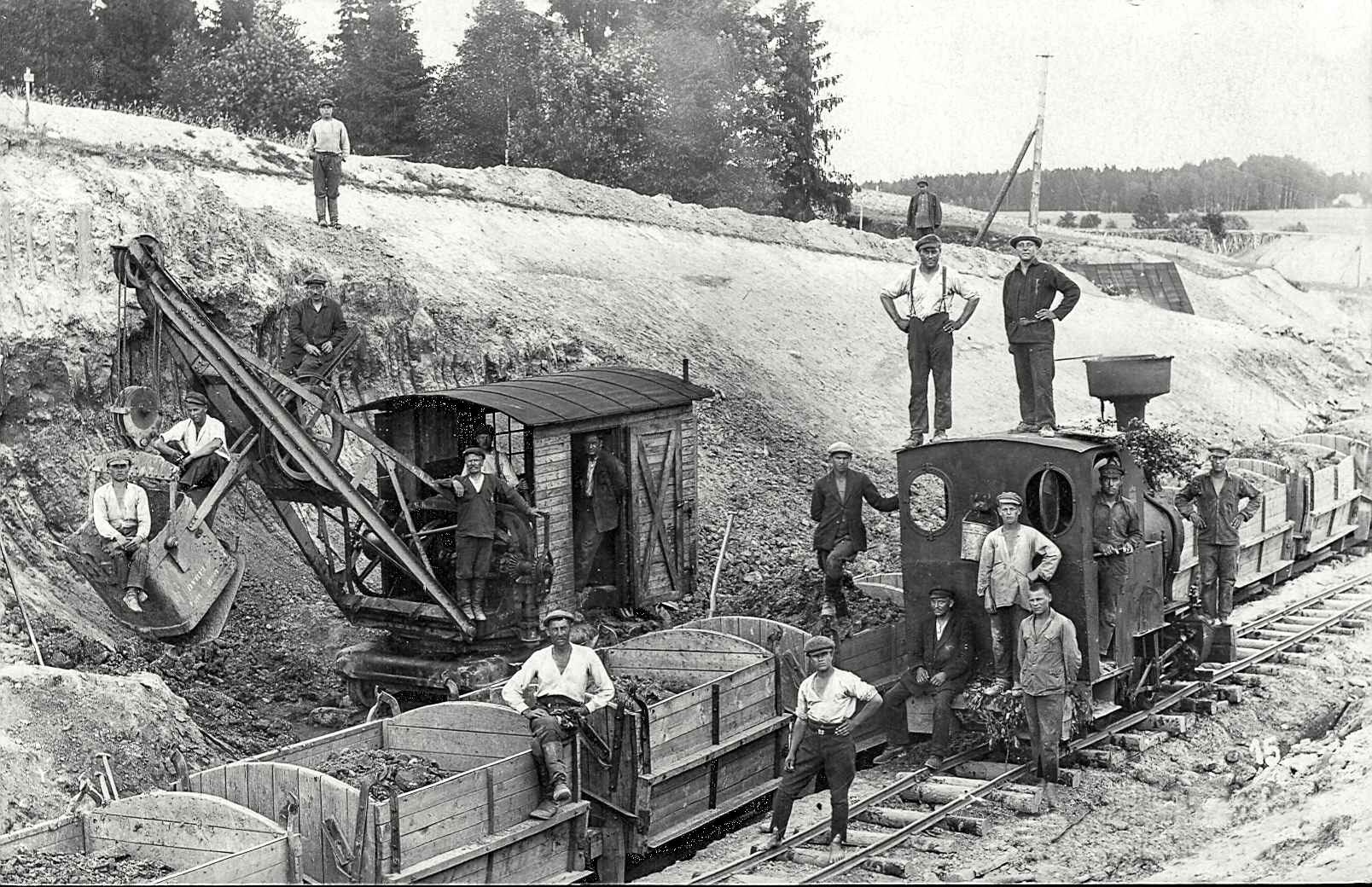
Construction of the Liepāja-Glūda railway, 1927. Excavation of a trench with an excavator and a narrow gauge railway in the section Sieksāte-Rudbārži.

After the Proclamation of the Republic of Latvia, with the establishment of the Latvian Railways High Board (Latvian: Dzelzceļu virsvalde) on 5 August 1919 the Latvian state took over the management of almost all railways located in the territory of Latvia. Narrow gauge railway lines remained in private hands, only one of which continued to be operated by a private legal entity. Since 5 August 1919, the board then operated the state-owned Latvijas dzelzceļi ('Latvijas valsts dzelzceļi', Latvian State Railways) company. It only took a few years to completely rebuild the railway infrastructure in Latvia. The Nord Express international train line was introduced to Riga in 1923, and provided a connection to Berlin and Paris, with a separate Riga–Moscow detour available. In 1925, the construction of new railways was started, stations and trains were modernized, and the Riga passenger station was provided with an electrical interlocking device for switches and signals – the first train safety device of this type in the Baltic States. By 1940, 840-kilometre (520 mi) of new railway lines were built, more than 200 iron bridges were constructed, as well as 130 new station buildings, while infrastructure destroyed during the WWI had been completely restored. After the Soviet occupation of Latvia, the occupation authorities dissolved the Railways High Board on 1 September 1940.

During the Second World War, the Latvian railway network was again severely damaged: most railway bridges and many station buildings were destroyed, and irreversible damage was caused to the tracks, as well as to the communications and signaling facilities.

After the Soviet re-occupation of the Baltic states, in the period until 1950, the railway industry was revived in key areas and a period of development began, which included electrification of railways on suburban passenger routes, construction of new bridges, transition to diesel cargo trains and long-distance passenger transport, improvement of rolling stock safety, etc. Along with the development of Ventspils Port and the USSR's industrialization policy in general from the 1960s to the 1980s, the volume of cargo transportation grew rapidly in the coming years. Electric and diesel trains manufactured in Riga by RVR ran on all suburban and local traffic routes, serving more and more passengers. Since 1963, the railways of Latvia, Estonia, Lithuania and the Kaliningrad region were supervised by the Soviet Baltic Railway Administration (Pribaltiyskaya railway), whose top management was located in Riga.

== History of Latvijas dzelzceļš Group (1991–present) ==
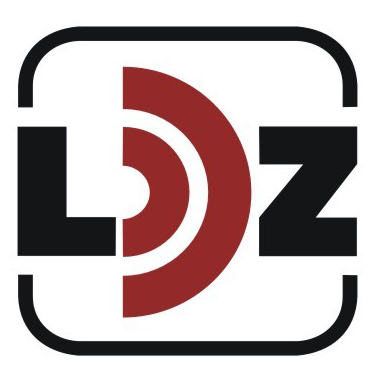
Latvian Railways logo (1992–2018)

After the restoration of Latvian independence in 1991, on 1 January 1992 the supervision and operation of all public railways in the territory of Latvia was transferred to the state enterprise (v/u) Latvijas dzelzceļš. At this moment, the restored Latvian state-owned company has at its disposal 2,364 kilometres (1,469 mi) of railway lines and 23,000 employees.

In 1993, the state enterprise Latvijas dzelzceļš was reformed into the state-owned joint-stock company (VAS) Latvijas dzelzceļš, whose shares are fully owned by the Latvian state.

In accordance with the restructuring program of the state-owned joint-stock company, the first subsidiary of the Latvijas dzelzceļš Group – Pasažieru vilciens, was established in 2001 as the LDz's passenger services division. Since 2008, it is a 100% state-owned independent joint-stock company, which adopted the trade name Vivi in 2023.

In 2003, a subsidiary – SIA Dzelzceļa Apsardze – was established, which in 2007 was renamed SIA LDZ Apsardze and provides security for LDz's rail infrastructure.

In connection with Latvia’s accession to the European Union, based on the restructuring program of the state-owned joint-stock company Latvijas dzelzceļš, the Group's subsidiaries were established in 2005: SIA LDZ Cargo, SIA LDZ Infrastruktūra and SIA LDZ Ritošā Sastāva Serviss. By separating logistics services from cargo services, in 2008 the subsidiary SIA LDZ Loģistika was established. In accordance with the amendments to the Law on Railways of the Republic of Latvia, in order to ensure the essential functions of the infrastructure manager within the Latvijas dzelzceļš Group, joint-stock LatRailNet was established in 2010.

== The directors of Latvijas Dzelzceļš ==
- Staņislavs Baiko (1991–1994)
- Vitolds Kūliņš (1994)
- Andris Zorgevics (1994–2005)
- Uģis Magonis (2005–2014)
- Aivars Strakšas (2014–2015)
- Edvīns Bērziņš (2015–2019)
- Māris Kleinbergs (2019–2023)
- Rinalds Pļavnieks (2023–2024)
- Artis Grinbergs (since 2024)

The main task of Latvijas dzelzceļš in the field of the Group's management is to ensure the development and competitiveness of the Group's business directions, achieving better results than would be possible if each business direction operated separately, while ensuring the operation of subsidiaries in the interests of the national economy.

== Corporate policy ==
The mission of the Latvijas dzelzceļš Group is to safely, efficiently and sustainably manage and develop Latvia’s railway infrastructure, while providing competitive railway and logistics services that serve in the interests of the Latvian national economy and society.

The vision of the Latvijas dzelzceļš Group is to become an efficient, competitive company providing high added value to customers by responding flexibly to changes in the transport sector.

Latvijas dzelzceļš is one of the largest employers in Latvia – employees who have been working for the company for several generations are its foundation. A professional team of railway personnel allows the Group to achieve its goals, adapt to market changes and work in conditions of high competition, while ensuring a consistently high level of traffic safety.

Since 2016 Latvijas dzelzceļš has been preparing a sustainability report, which was initially prepared based on the international GRI (Global Reporting Initiative) guidelines, but since 2018 the report has been prepared taking into account the basic requirements of the GRI standard. An independent audit company provides its conclusion on the annual report. All sustainability reports are available at: parskati.ldz.lv.

== Domestic routes ==
Frequency of commuter trains, 2016

Passenger services are operated by Pasažieru vilciens. The passenger lines with current service are:

- Torņakalns – Tukums II Railway^{1}
- Riga – Jelgava Railway^{2}
- Jelgava – Liepāja Railway 8 times a week per direction
- Riga – Daugavpils Railway^{3} 5 times a day
- Riga - Daugavpils - Aglona 1 time per year
- Krustpils – Rēzekne – Zilupe (border of Russia)
  - Two trains a day from Riga continue past Krustpils on this diesel train line in Latvia's central and eastern countryside, as well as the daily service from Riga to Moscow.
- Rīga – Sigulda – Cēsis – Valmiera – Valga (in Estonia)
  - Leaving the Riga Central Station, this branch includes neighborhood stations Zemitāni, Čiekurkalns, and Jugla. During Soviet times, electric trains went up to Sigulda but the service is now diesel. Sigulda has around 11 trains a day, Cēsis 6, Valmiera 4, and 2 trains a day continue the full length of the line to serve the Latvian / Estonian border towns of Valka and Valga through a joint station in Valga.
- Zemitāni – Skulte Railway^{4}
- Pļaviņas – Gulbene

Lines where passenger services have been suspended in recent years include:

- Rīga – Reņģe (Border of Lithuania)
- Rīga – Ērgļi, the railway was removed
- Jelgava – Meitene (Border of Lithuania)
- Jelgava – Krustpils
- Kārsava (Border of Russia) – Rēzekne – Daugavpils – Zemgale (border of Lithuania)
- Eglaine (Border of Lithuania) – Daugavpils – Indra (border of Belarus), trains currently continue to Indra twice a week.

^{1} Electrified to Tukums ^{2} Electrified to Jelgava ^{3} Electrified to Aizkraukle ^{4} Whole line is electrified

== International routes ==
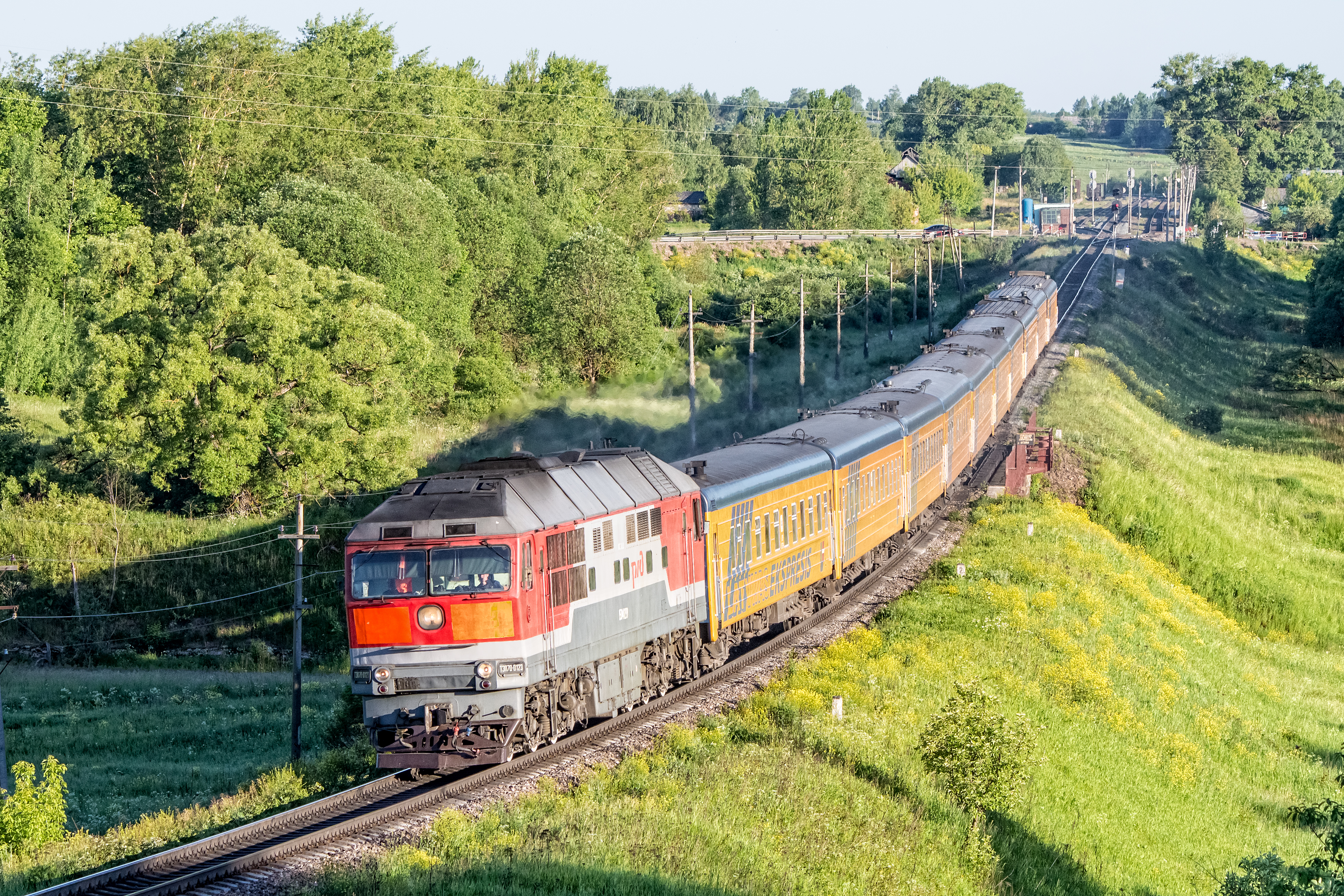
Latvijas Expresis was a name of company's overnight service to Moscow

There are rail links with Lithuania and Estonia. LDz trains stop in Valka/Valga and connections to Tartu are available via Estonian operator Elron. Daugavpils was connected to Vilnius by a Lithuanian Railways service at weekends. All international passenger services were suspended in March 2020 during the coronavirus pandemic. Services to Ukraine were not restarted following the pandemic due to the Russian invasion of Ukraine in 2022 and state sanctions against the Belarusian and Russian governments.

Overnight services to/from Riga and Russian cities were operated by Latvijas Ekspresis (Latvia Express).

- Riga – Šiauliai – Vilnius – Minsk – Kyiv (Suspended)
  - Every fourth day overnight service operated with Ukrainian stock
  - Together the two Riga – Minsk trains offer connection every other day
- Daugavpils – Vilnius (suspended)
  - Two to three times a day every Saturday and Sunday
- Tallinn – Valga – Riga – Jelgava – Joniškis – Šiauliai – Kaišiadorys – Vilnius
  - Route Vilnius-Riga operates daily since Dec 27 2023 by LTG Link, in January 2025 the route was extended to Valka (operated by LTG Link) and further on to Tallinn (operated by Elron).

== Freight services ==
Latvian railways carry a large quantity of freight cargo, and freight trains operate over the whole current passenger network, and a number of lines currently closed to passenger services.

All railways with closed lines

== Other services ==
There is a narrow gauge railway between Gulbene and Alūksne, operated by the company SIA "Gulbenes – Alūksnes bānītis" under government contract, using Russian and Polish built heritage rolling stock. Three narrow gauge trains a day operate on the 33 kilometres (21 mi) route between the two towns. As of 2019, the service has been extended to two daily trains in both directions.

== Rolling stock ==
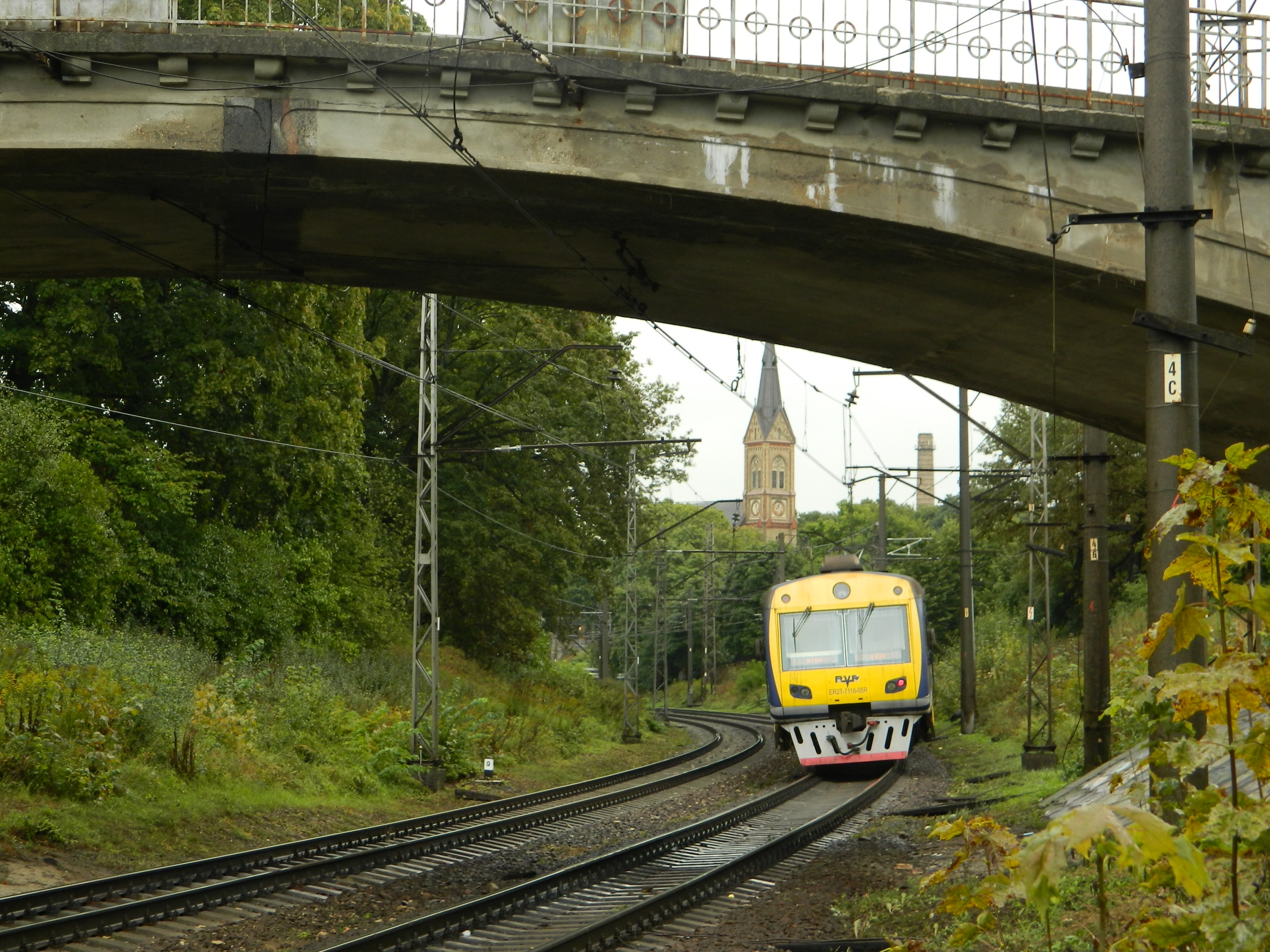
RVR ER2T train in Riga

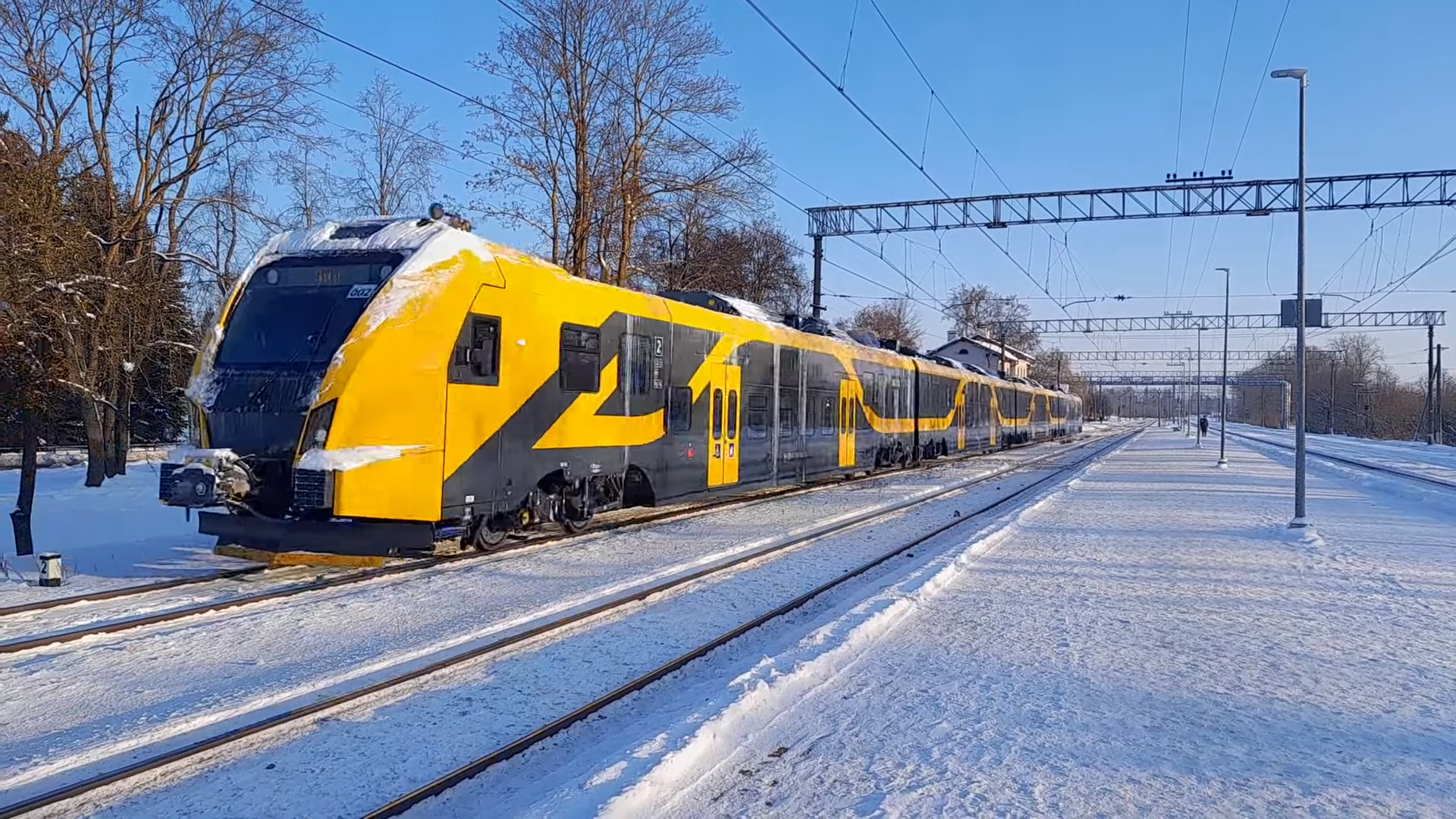
Škoda 16EV in Salaspils Station

=== Diesel locos ===
Freight

- M62 – 33 locos
- 2M62 – 40 locos
- 2M62UM – 30 locos
- 2TE10M – 10 locos
- 2TE10U – 14 locos
- 2TE116 – 11 locos

Passenger

- TEP70 – 15 locos

Shunt

- ČME3^{M}, ČME3MB (ChME3) – 57 locos
- TEM2 – 7 locos
- TGK2V – 1 loco
- TGM3 – 1 loco
- TGM23, TGM23B – 2 locos

=== EMUs ===
- ER2 – 32 trains [set to be retired]
- ER2T – 6 trains (7113-7118)
- ER2^{M} – 1 train (No 605)

=== Škodas ===
- Škoda Vagonka 16EV – 32 trains

=== DMUs ===
- DR1A – 31 trains
- DR1A^{M} – 10 trains
- AR2 (railbus) – 1 train (used by workers on Jelgava-Krustpils line)

== See also ==
- History of rail transport in Latvia
- Latvian Railway History Museum
- Rail transport in Latvia
- Transport in Latvia
- Edelaraudtee - Estonia's railway infrastructure company
- LTG Infra - Lithuania's railway infrastructure company
