= Liepāja Station =

Railway station in Liepāja, Latvia

Liepāja
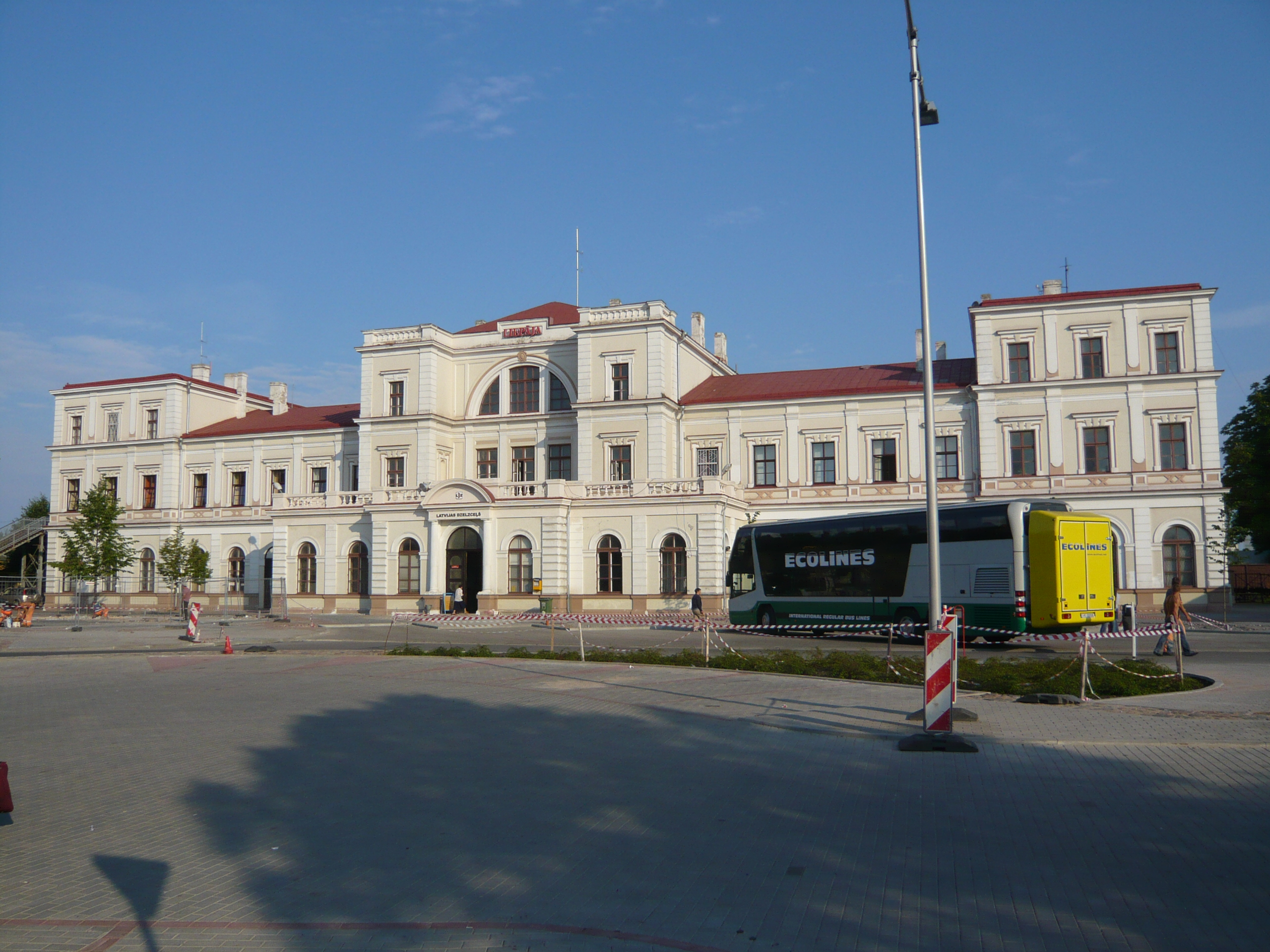
- Liepāja Station in 2010

General information
- Coordinates: 56°31′26.91″N 21°1′0.93″E
- Platforms: 2
- Tracks: 11

History
- Opened: 1871

Services
Preceding station	LDz	Following station
Skrunda towards Jelgava	Jelgava–Liepāja	Terminus
Location

Liepāja Station is the railway station for Liepāja on the Jelgava – Liepāja Railway.

== History ==
The station was built in 1871 as the first station in the Libau–Romny Railway, Libau being the German name of the city in use at the time.
