= Jelgava–Liepāja Railway =

Railway in Latvia

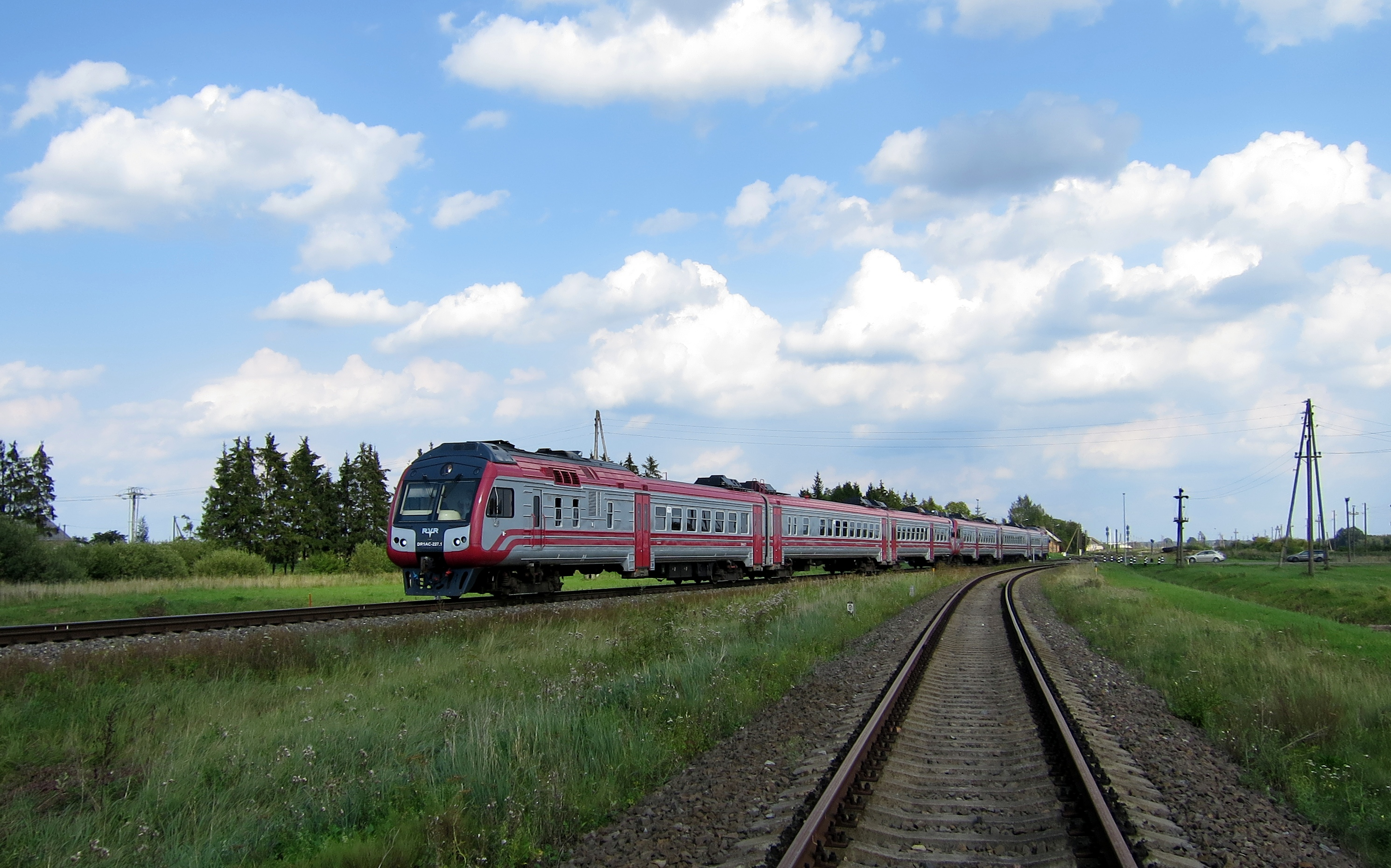

Overview
- Termini: Jelgava Station; Liepāja Station

Service
- Operator(s): Latvian Railways

History
- Opened: 1929

Technical
- Line length: 180 km (111.85 mi)
- Track gauge: 1,524 mm (5 ft)

The Jelgava–Liepāja Railway is a 180 kilometres (110 mi) long, 1,524 mm (5 ft) gauge railway built in the 20th century to connect the cities Jelgava and Liepāja, Latvia.

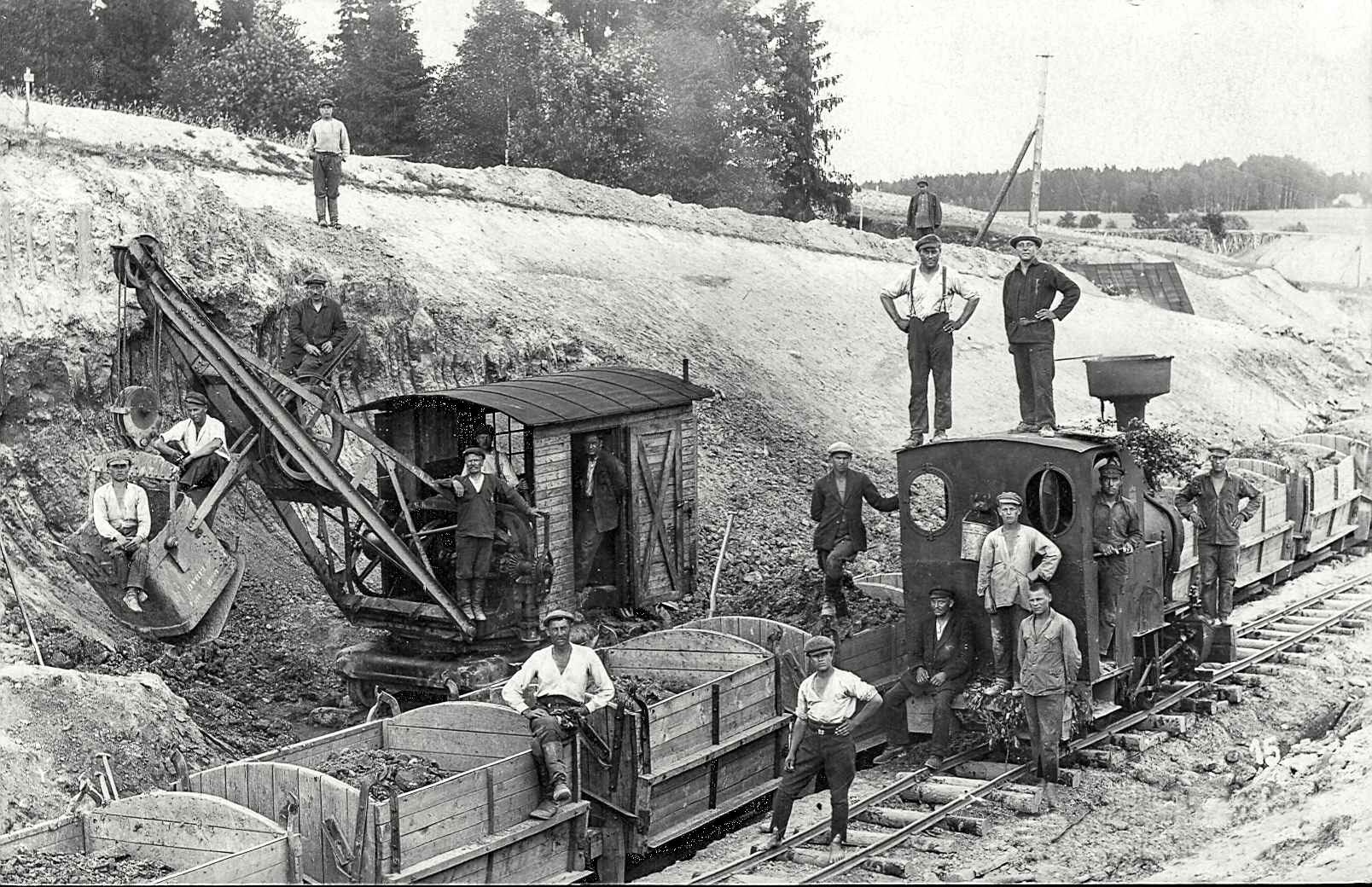
Construction in the Sieksāte–Rudbārži section of the Liepāja–Glūda railway, 1927.

== See also ==
Railway lines in Latvia in 2016.

- Rail transport in Latvia
- History of rail transport in Latvia

== Bibliography ==
- Altbergs, T.; Augustāne, K.; Pētersone, I. (2009). Dzelzceļi Latvijā [Railways in Latvia] (in Latvian). Jumava. ISBN 978-9984-38-698-0.
