= Gulbene =

Town and capital of Gulbene Municipality, Latvia

- Town
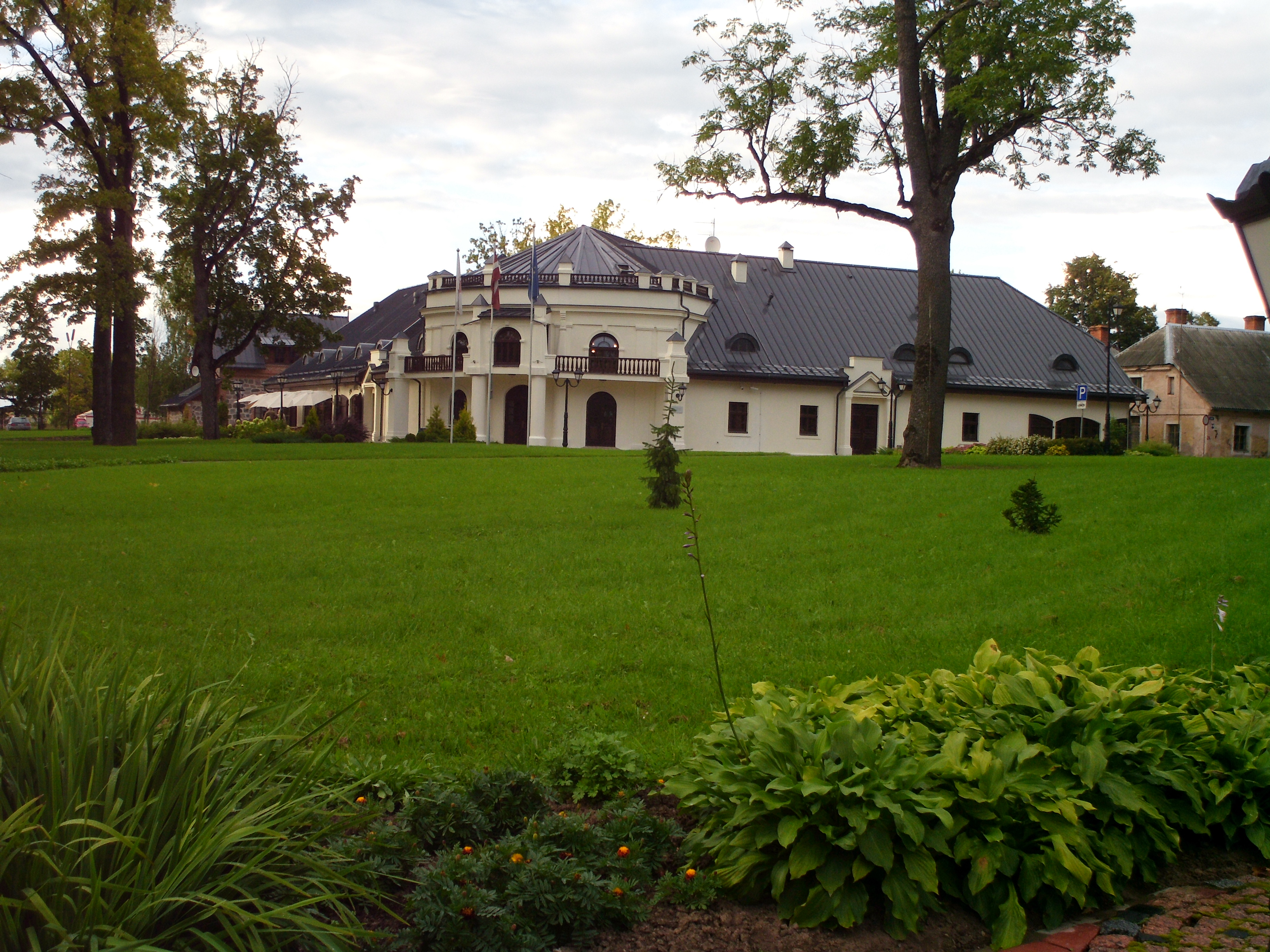

- Flag Coat of arms

- Location in Latvia
- Coordinates: 57°10′N 26°45′E
- Country: Latvia
- District: Gulbene Municipality
- Town rights: 1928

Government
  - Chairman of the Municipality Council: Andis Caunītis

Area
  - Total: 11.91 km^{2} (4.60 sq mi)
  - Land: 11.41 km^{2} (4.41 sq mi)
  - Water: 0.5 km^{2} (0.19 sq mi)

Population (2026)
  - Total: 6,683
  - Density: 585.7/km^{2} (1,517/sq mi)
- Time zone: UTC+2 (EET)
  - Summer (DST): UTC+3 (EEST)
- Postal code: LV-4401
- Calling code: +371 644
- Number of city council members: 11
- Climate: Dfb
- Website: www.gulbene.lv

Gulbene (German: Schwanenburg) is a town in the Vidzeme region of Latvia. It is the administrative center of Gulbene Municipality.

== History ==
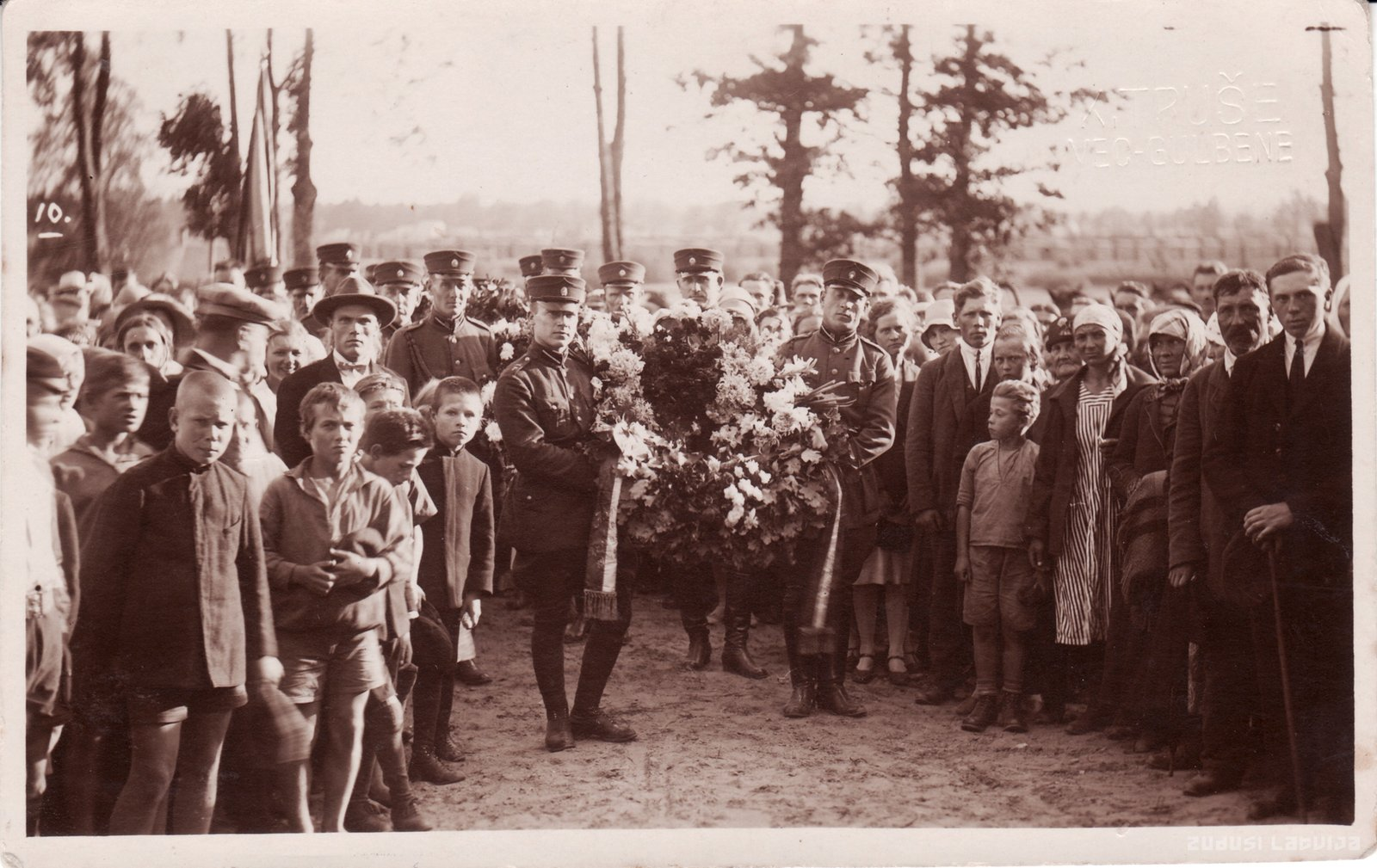
Unveiling ceremony of the monument to the fallen heroes during the Latvian War of Independence

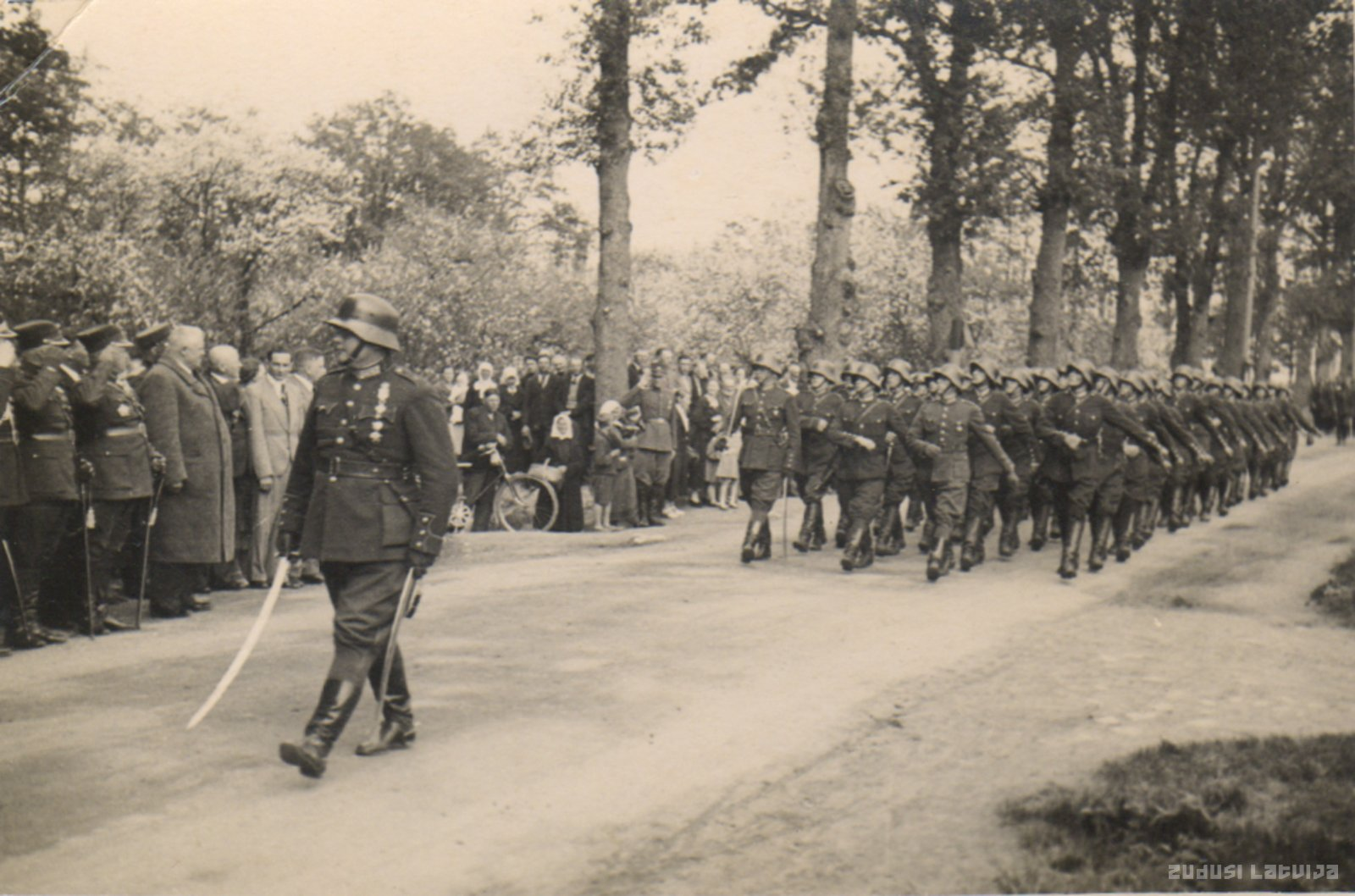
Latvian Army parade in front of President Kārlis Ulmanis in Gulbene

Historical documents first mention the 1224 land division act between the Order of the Sword Brothers and the Archbishop of Riga. In the 14th century, the Archbishop built a stone castle around which a populated place was formed.

The Evangelical Lutheran church (Brivības iela 13) was built on the ancient Latgalian castle mound in place of the later Middle Ages brick castle from 1838–1843. The church is built in the classical style.

Vecgulbene (Old Gulbene) estate complex was built in the middle and second half of the 19th century not far from the church. The most significant buildings are the White Palace (Brivības iela 12), the Red Palace (Parka iela 1), and the magazine granary (Brivības iela 9). Both palaces have been destroyed and rebuilt several times. Since 1924, the elementary school of the city has occupied the Red Palace. Since 2004, the Administration of Stradi Parish occupies a part of the palace.

After the construction of the Stukmani to Valka narrow-gauge railway in 1903 and subsequent broad-gauge line construction during World War I, Vecgulbene was established as an important railway junction, and in 1920 it was given the status of a small village. During the first period of Latvian independence, besides those employed by the railways, small business, trades, and crafts were the most important economic activities in the town. Gulbene was heavily damaged during the last years of World War II. After the war, during the Soviet occupation, Gulbene initially became a district, and later, in 1950, a regional centre. In the 1960s and 1970s, branches of several major industrial companies were established in the city. Local enterprise was mainly involved with wood processing.

The most architecturally significant building in the area is the passenger building at Gulbene railway station, built in 1926 by the well-known professor of architecture Peteris Feders (1868–1936). It is one of the largest and most magnificent railway station buildings in Latvia.

Services at Gulbene Station
- Current services
  Preceding station	LDz	Following station
  Jaungulbene towards Pļaviņas or Veseta	Pļaviņas–Gulbene	Terminus
  Terminus	Gulbene–Alūksne Narrow-gauge	Birze towards Alūksne

== 1999 massacre ==
On 22nd February 1999, 3 children & a staff member were hacked to death & another staff member was left with serious injuries after an attack with a meat cleaver by 19-year-old Alexander Koryakov. All of the victims were Russian speakers. This attack was one of the worst attacks in Latvian history. The trial began on 29 November 1999, and Koryakov was sentenced to life imprisonment.

== Geography ==
There is one major town in the Gulbene municipality, and the region is separated into 13 smaller rural parishes. Gulbene is being developed as an environmentally-friendly territory.

=== Climate ===
Gulbene has a humid continental climate (Köppen Dfb). Gulbene has a cold and long winter, a warm and short summer, and a fleeting spring and autumn. Winters are often below −25 °C (−13 °F). In the cold waves of 1940, 1956, 1978, 1985, and 1987, there were low temperatures below −35 °C (−31 °F), and even extremely cold weather approaching −40 °C (−40 °F). In mid-summer, there will be warm weather exceeding 25 °C (77 °F), and sometimes there will be high temperatures exceeding 30 °C (86 °F). The monthly averages range from −6 °C (21 °F) to 18 °C (64 °F), whereas all-time extremes range from −39.0 °C (−38.2 °F) on 16 January 1940 to 33.8 °C (92.8 °F) on 11 August 1992.

Climate data for Gulbene (1991–2020 normals, extremes 1923–present)
Month	Jan	Feb	Mar	Apr	May	Jun	Jul	Aug	Sep	Oct	Nov	Dec	Year
Record high °C (°F)	9.7 (49.5)	11.0 (51.8)	17.3 (63.1)	26.8 (80.2)	30.1 (86.2)	32.6 (90.7)	33.6 (92.5)	33.8 (92.8)	29.8 (85.6)	22.5 (72.5)	14.3 (57.7)	11.3 (52.3)	33.8 (92.8)
Mean daily maximum °C (°F)	−2.4 (27.7)	−1.8 (28.8)	3.2 (37.8)	11.2 (52.2)	17.3 (63.1)	20.8 (69.4)	23.1 (73.6)	21.7 (71.1)	16.1 (61.0)	8.9 (48.0)	2.6 (36.7)	−0.7 (30.7)	10.0 (50.0)
Daily mean °C (°F)	−4.5 (23.9)	−4.6 (23.7)	−0.5 (31.1)	6.2 (43.2)	11.8 (53.2)	15.4 (59.7)	17.8 (64.0)	16.5 (61.7)	11.4 (52.5)	5.6 (42.1)	0.8 (33.4)	−2.6 (27.3)	6.1 (43.0)
Mean daily minimum °C (°F)	−7.3 (18.9)	−7.8 (18.0)	−4.2 (24.4)	1.2 (34.2)	5.8 (42.4)	9.9 (49.8)	12.5 (54.5)	11.3 (52.3)	7.1 (44.8)	2.5 (36.5)	−1.6 (29.1)	−4.8 (23.4)	2.1 (35.7)
Record low °C (°F)	−39.0 (−38.2)	−37.6 (−35.7)	−26.5 (−15.7)	−15.4 (4.3)	−6.0 (21.2)	−1.0 (30.2)	3.6 (38.5)	0.5 (32.9)	−5.6 (21.9)	−13.5 (7.7)	−22.8 (−9.0)	−38.4 (−37.1)	−39.0 (−38.2)
Average precipitation mm (inches)	46.1 (1.81)	38.1 (1.50)	36.7 (1.44)	34.7 (1.37)	57.5 (2.26)	78.1 (3.07)	71.8 (2.83)	70.6 (2.78)	53.5 (2.11)	68.1 (2.68)	53.6 (2.11)	47.5 (1.87)	656.3 (25.83)
Average precipitation days (≥ 1 mm)	12	9	9	8	9	11	10	11	9	12	11	12	123
Average relative humidity (%)	89.0	86.3	76.4	67.3	67.0	72.3	75.3	78.1	83.1	87.6	90.7	90.9	80.3
Source 1: LVĢMC
Source 2: NOAA (precipitation days, humidity 1991–2020)

== Demographics ==
Within existing limits, according to CSB data.

=== Population changes ===
Historical population

Year	Pop.	±%
1935	3,819	—
1959	7,178	+88.0%
1970	8,722	+21.5%
1979	9,484	+8.7%

Year	Pop.	±%
1989	10,346	+9.1%
2000	9,620	−7.0%
2011	8,314	−13.6%
2021	7,040	−15.3%

Source: Latvian Geospatial Information Agency

== Tourism ==
The Gulbenes Regional History and Art Museum displays one of the most valuable relics of Latvian museums – a chair designed by Julius Madernieks (1870–1955) made in the 1920s. Julius Madernieks was the founder of Latvian professional applied art, born in Vecgulbenes parish and a notable person in the city of Gulbene.

=== Sports ===
The Gulbene municipality's biggest rivers (Gauja, Tirza and Pededze) are currently popular locations for nature tourism and water sports, but once they were famous places for harvesting river pearls. Cycling is enjoyed on local country paths.

Gulbene has a basketball team, Gulbenes Buki, playing in the higher division of the Latvian basketball league.

== Media ==
The Gulbene region is served by a newspaper, Dzirkstele.

== Gallery ==
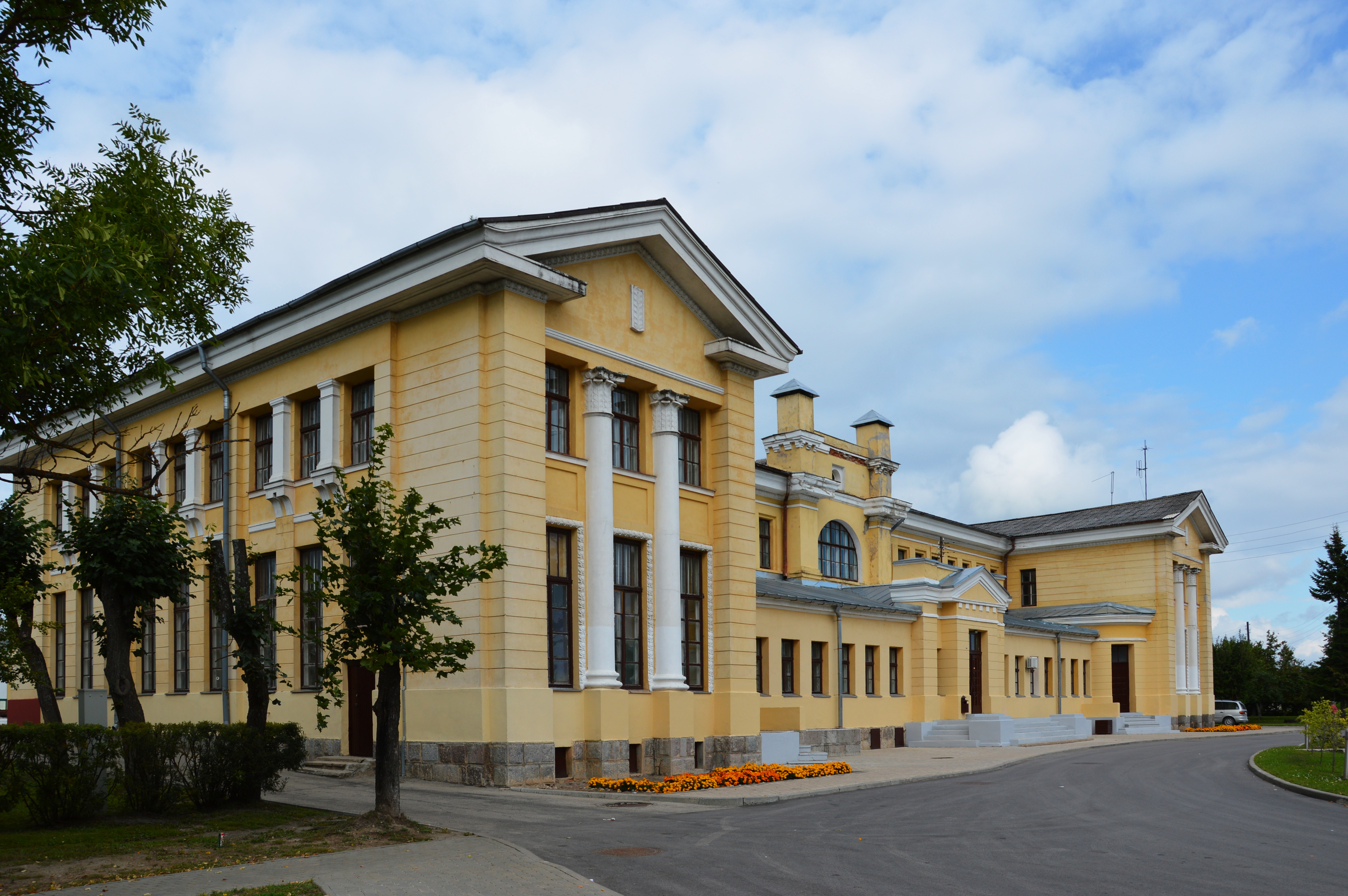
Gulbene Railway Station

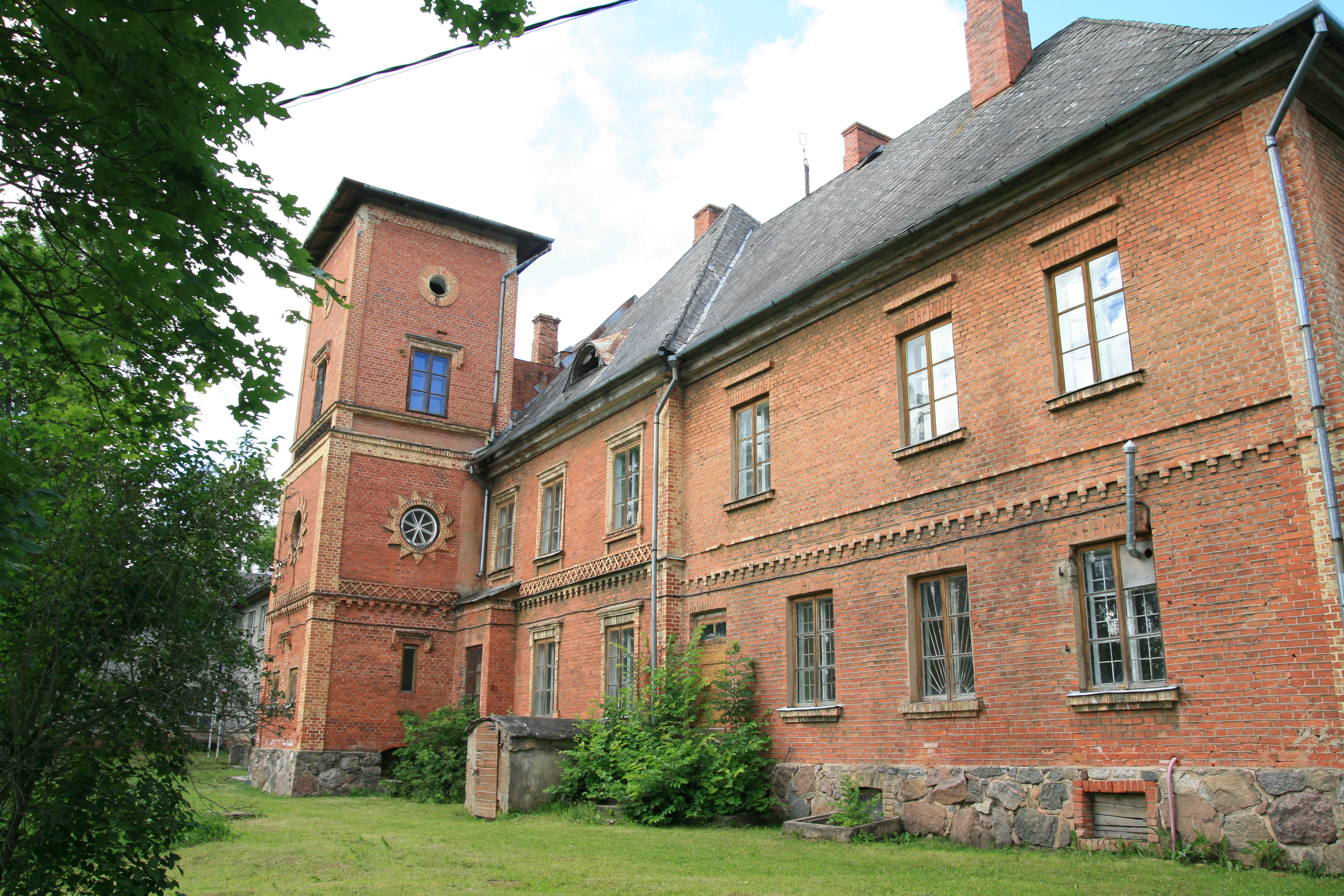
Red Castle of Gulbene

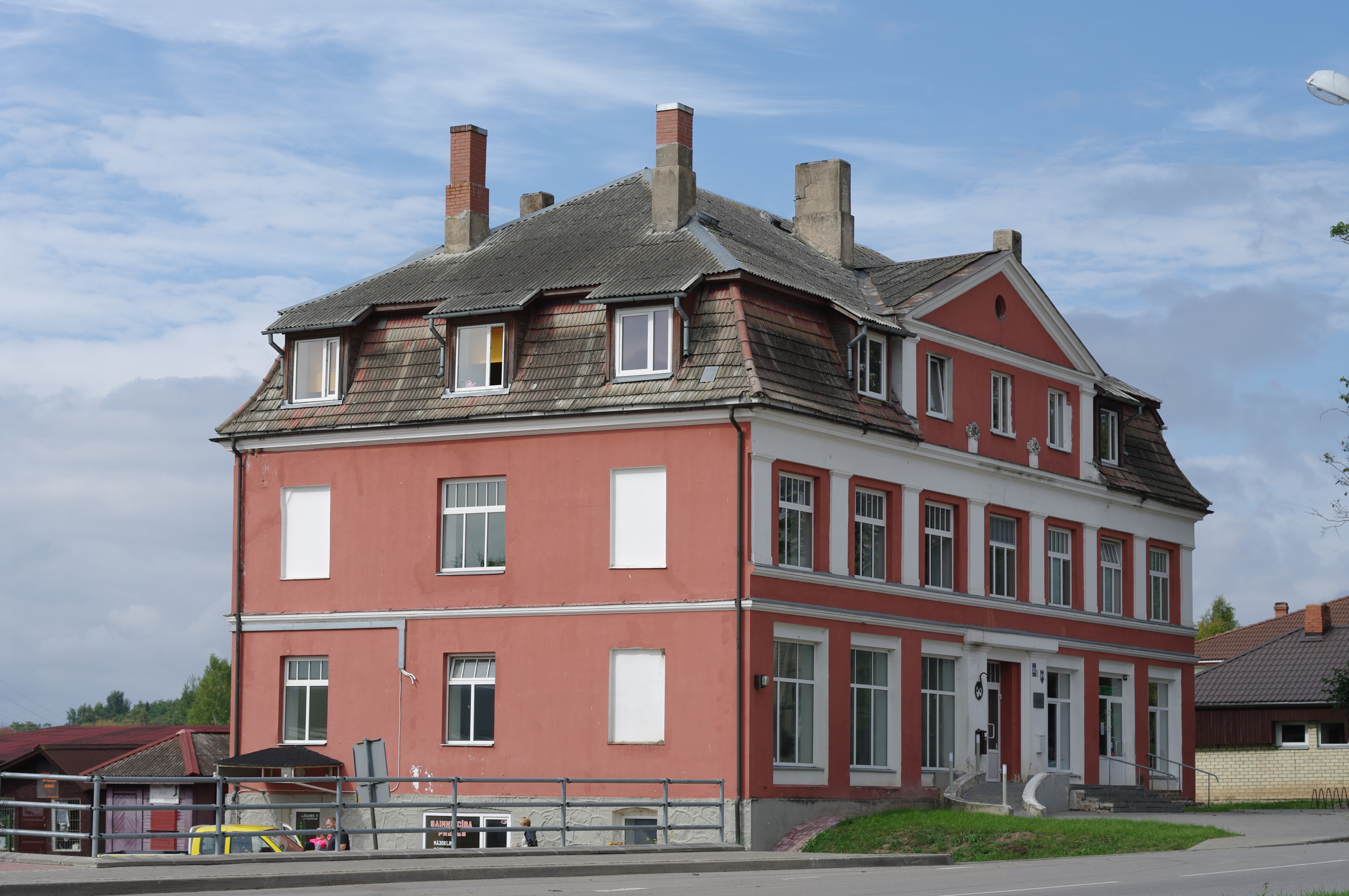
Building on the Vidus street in Gulbene

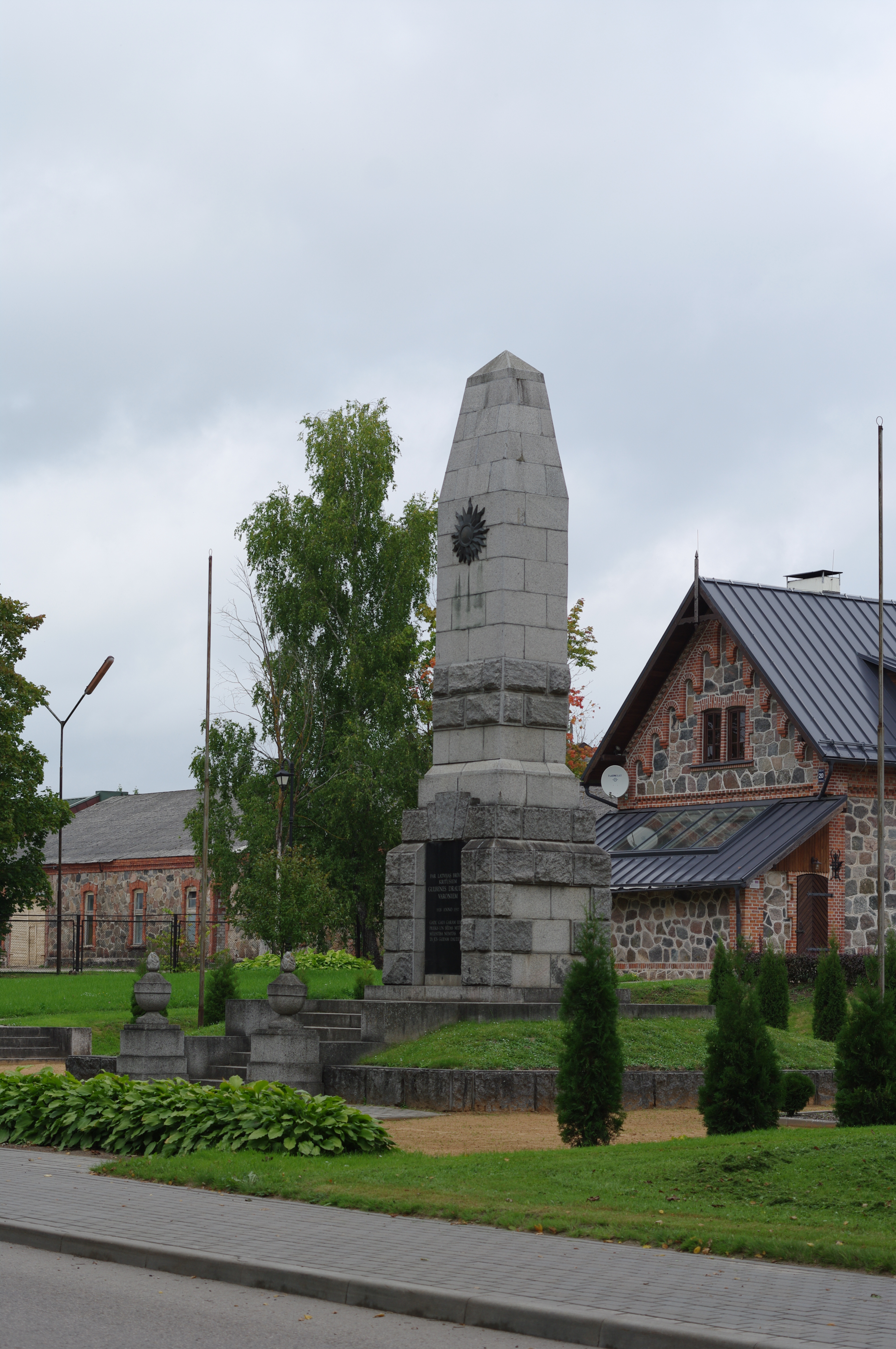
War of independence Monument in Gulbene

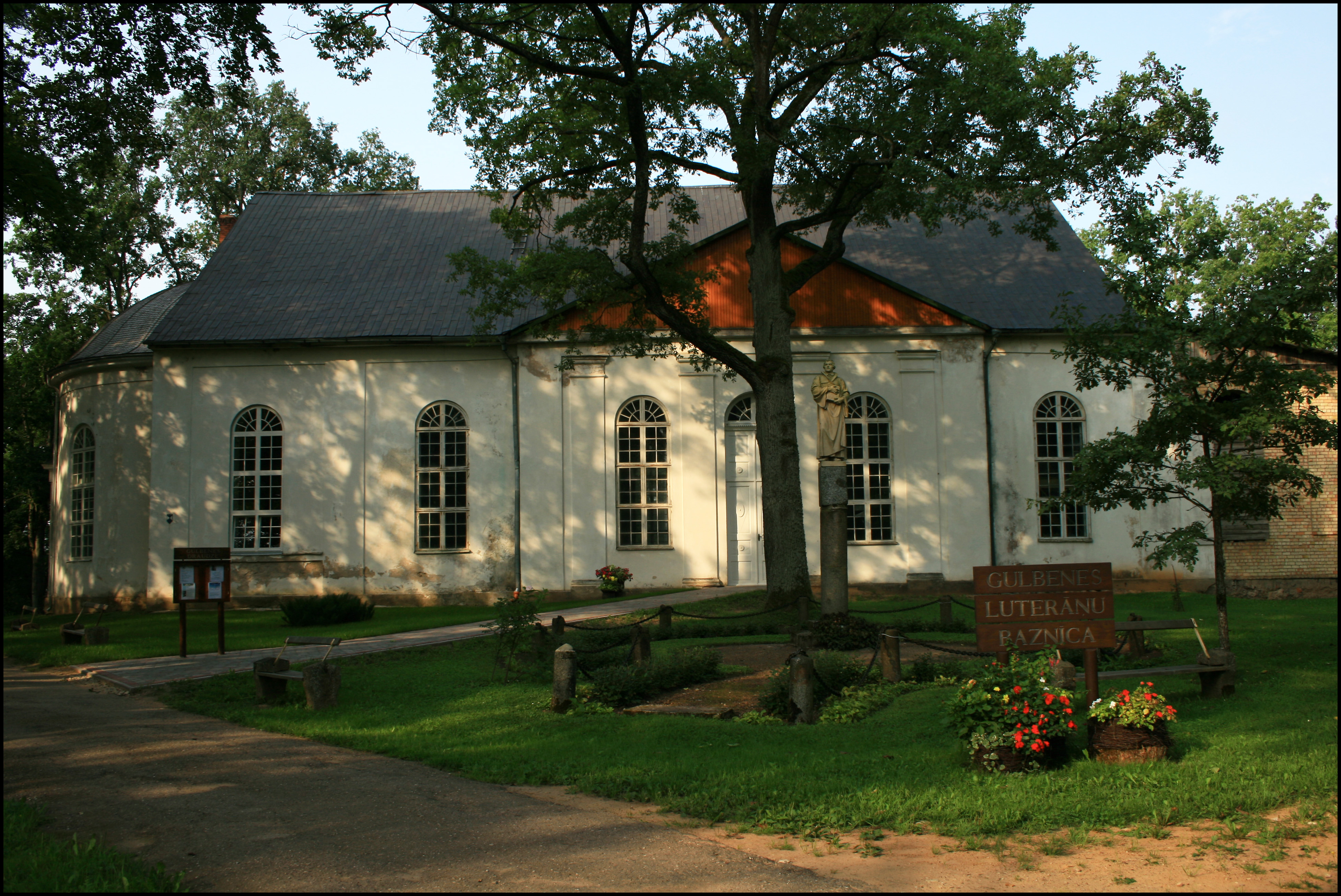
Lutheran church

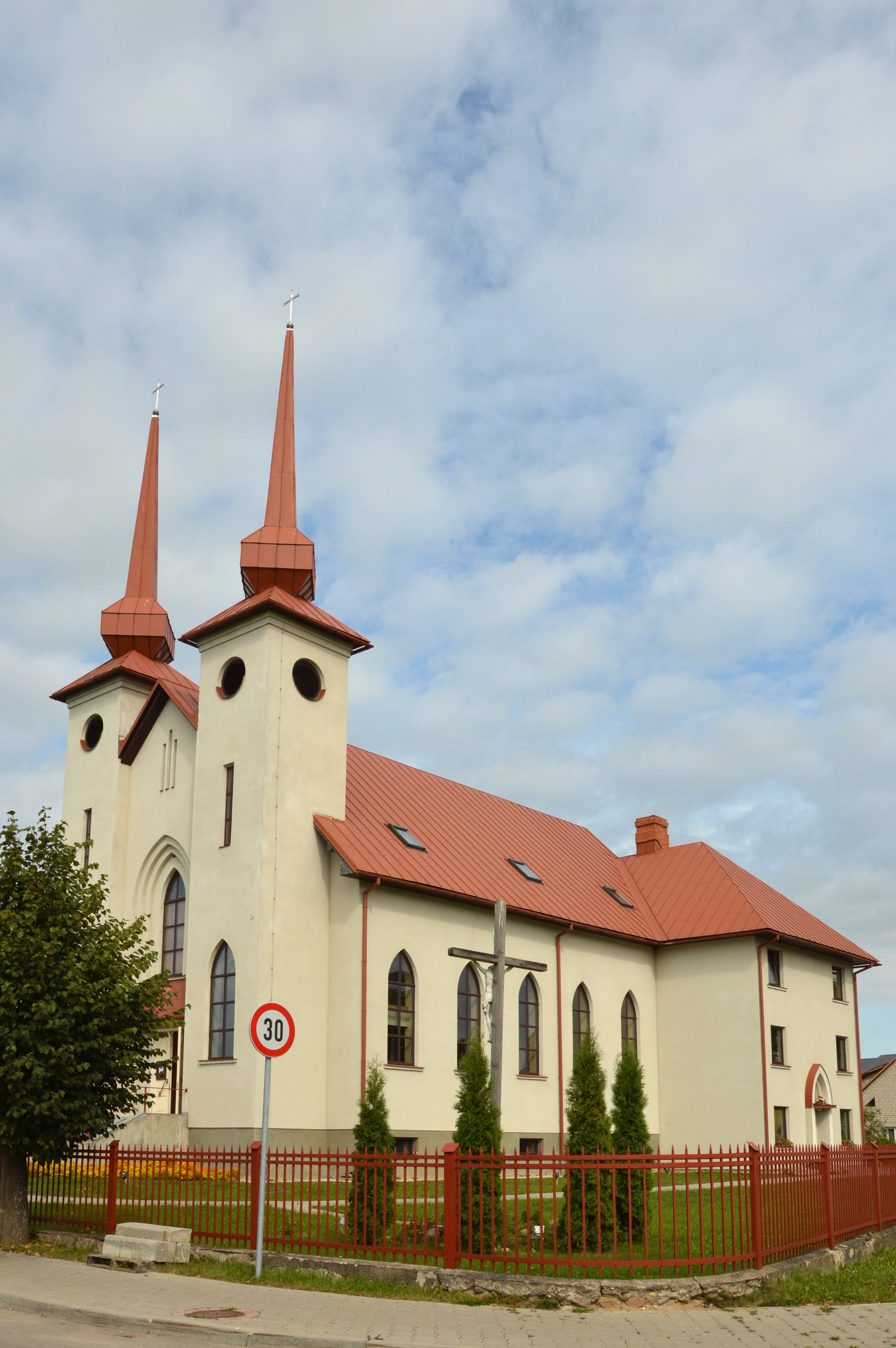
Church of the Most Holy Sacrament

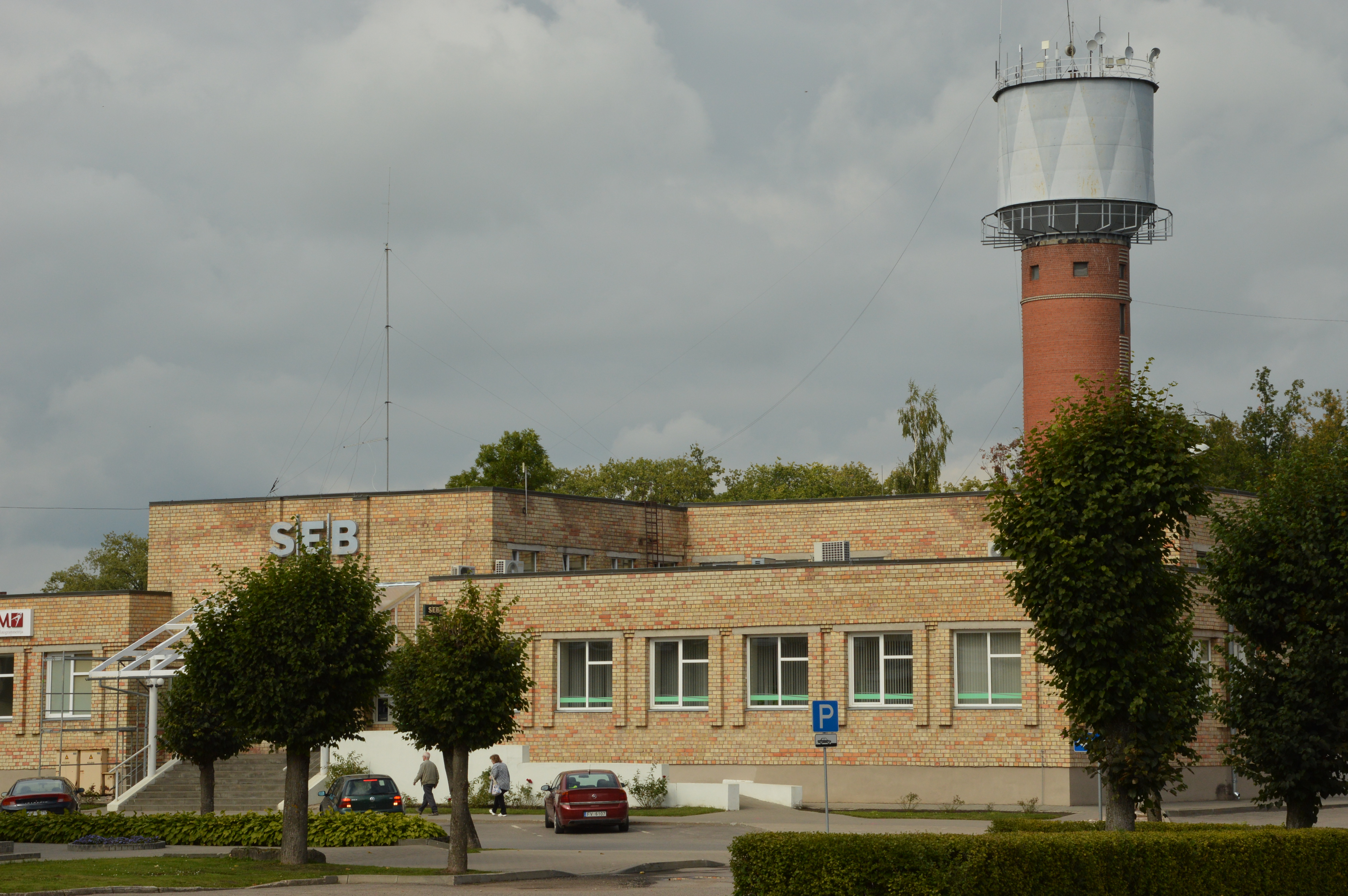

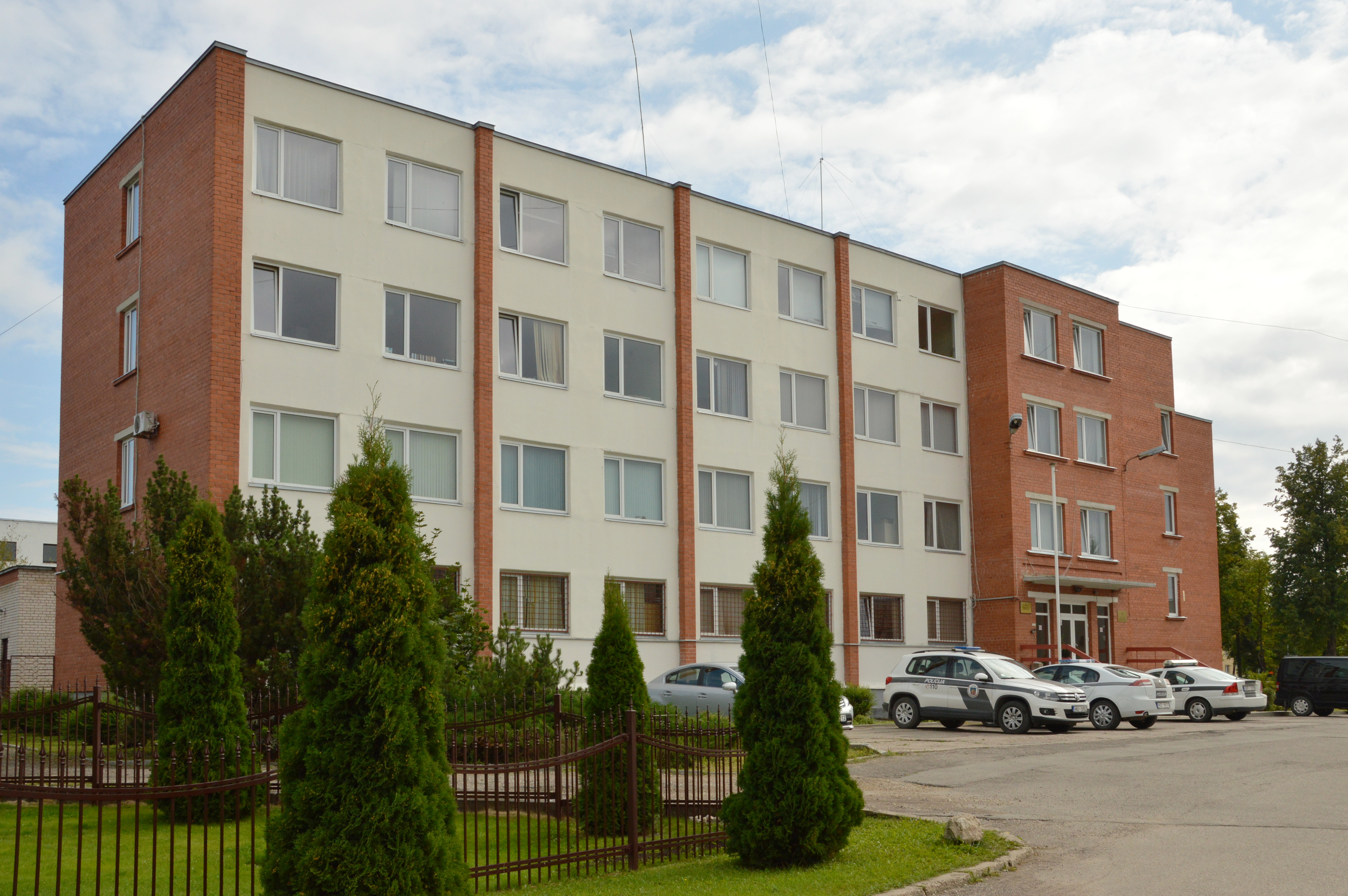
Gulbene Police Station

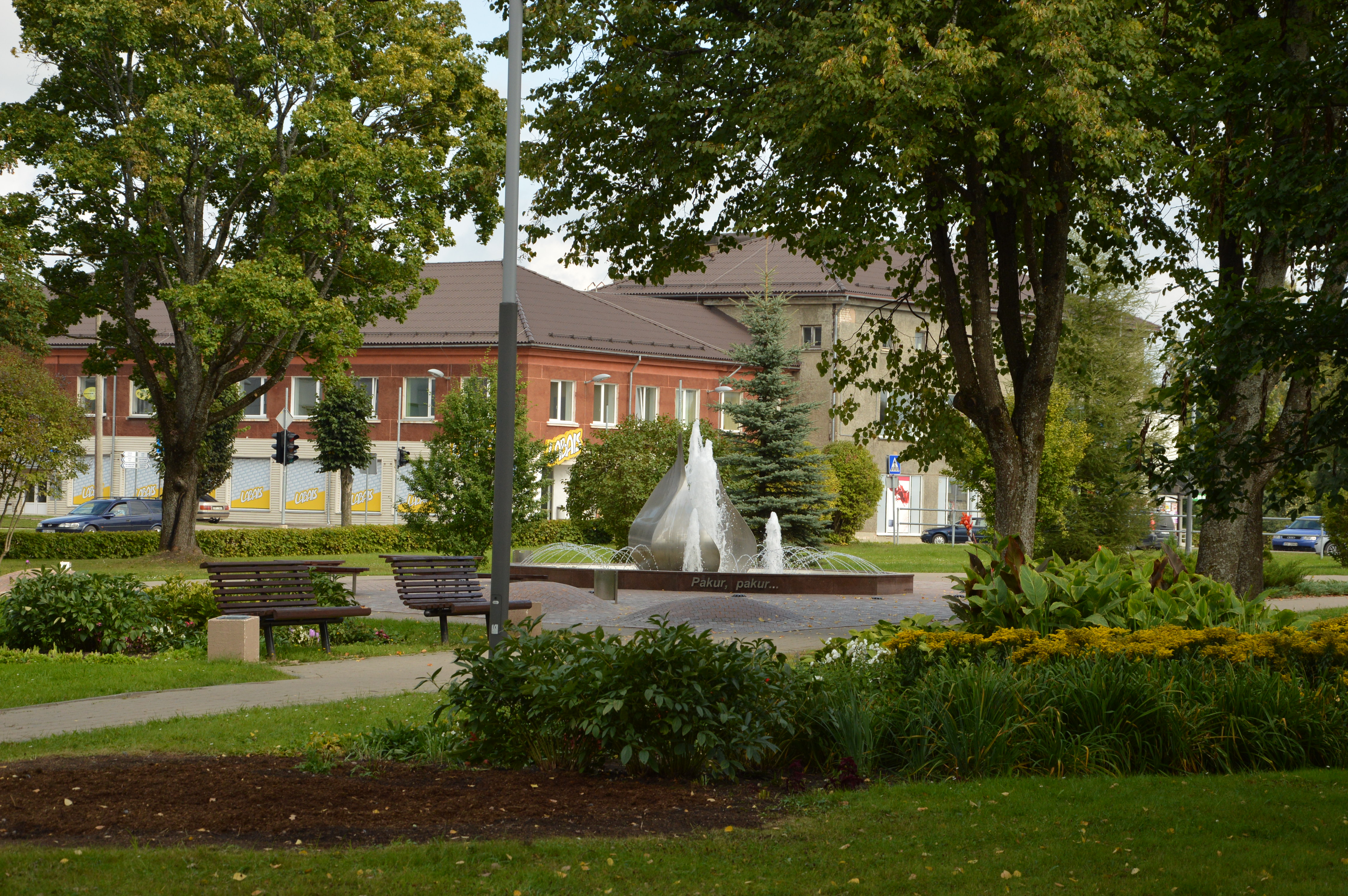
Park with a fountain

== Twin towns ==
- Babruysk, Belarus
- Rietavas, Lithuania
- Them, Denmark

== Notable people ==
- Augusts Malvess (1878–1951), architect
- Gido Kokars (1921–2017), conductor, choirmaster
- Imants Kokars (1921–2011), conductor, choirmaster
- Inguna Sudraba (born 1964), politician, deputy finance minister, 1994 to 2003
- Anmary (born 1980), singer, real name Linda Dinsberga, sang in the Eurovision Song Contest 2012

=== Sport ===
- Arvis Piziks (born 1969), cyclist, rode at three Olympic Games
- Madara Līduma (born 1982), biathlete, competed in the Biathlon at the 2006 Winter Olympics
- Edgars Maskalāns (born 1982), bobsledder, competed in the 2010 Winter Olympics
- Jānis Paipals (born 1983), cross-country skier, competed in the 2010 Winter Olympics
- Linda Savļaka (born 1984), biathlete, competed in three events at the 2006 Winter Olympics
- Daumants Dreiškens (born 1984), bobsledder, team silver medallist at the 2014 Winter Olympics
- Armands Zvirbulis (born 1987), freestyle wrestler, competed at the 2012 Summer Olympics

== See also ==
- List of cities and towns in Latvia
