= Lejasciems =

Village in Latvia

- Village
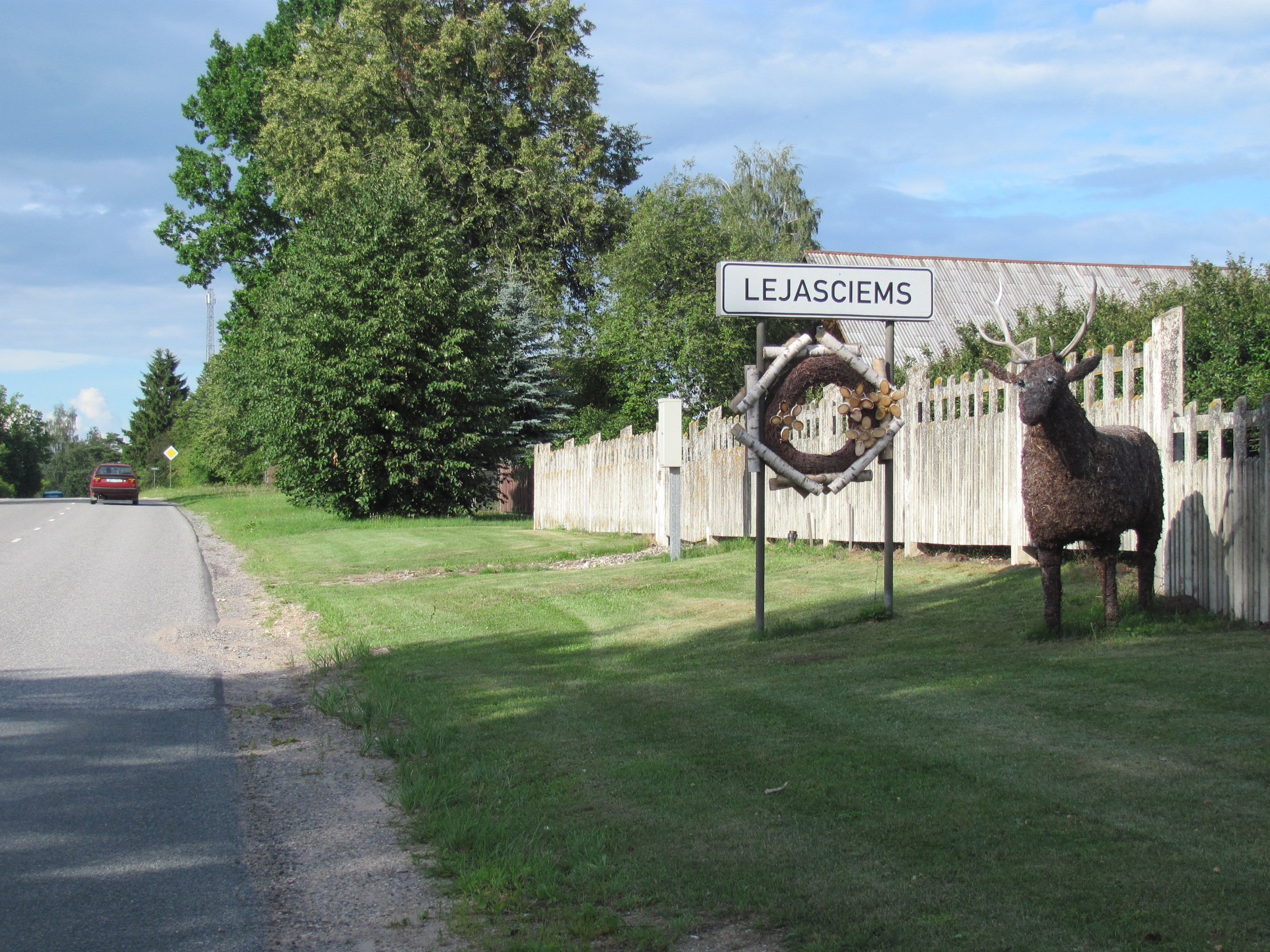
- Village entrance

- Seal

- Lejasciems's location in Latvia
- Coordinates: 57°16′43″N 26°34′31″E
- Country: Latvia
- Municipality: Gulbene
- Parish: Lejasciems
- Founded: 1867
- Town Rights: 1928
- Lost town rights: 1939

Population (2015)
  - Total: 1,655

Lejasciems (German: Aahof) is a village in Gulbene Municipality, in the Vidzeme region of Latvia. It is the center of Lejasciems Parish.

The settlement was founded in 1867 by the Baltic Domain Board on land owned by the government of the Russian Empire. Previously, the area had been a part of Lejasmuiža Manor (also Gauja Manor, German: Aahof).

In 1928 Lejasciems received town rights, but lost them in 1939 due to economic stagnation. The main reason for this was the construction of the Pļaviņas–Gulbene Railway, which drew most of the businesses and economic activity away from Lejasciems. During the Soviet occupation, Sudala village was merged into Lejasciems in 1945, Dūre village - in 1962 and a former part of Sinole village in 1977.

The coat of arms, approved in October 1938, represents the blue Gauja River and golden fields on the sides.
