= Laima Muktupāvela =

Latvian writer

- Born: January 20, 1962 (age 64); Rēzekne, Latvian SSR
- Education: University of Latvia
- Writing career
- Pen name: Felikss Baranovskis
- Language: Latvian
- Notable work: Šampinjonu Derība (The Mushroom Testament)

Laima Muktupāvela Kota (née Vucina; born 20 January 1962 in Rēzekne) is a Latvian author.

== Life ==
Muktupāvela was born in 1962 and she graduated with a History degree in 1989. She worked at various jobs until she became a full-time writer in 2000 after working part-time on published works for seven years. She won a prize for her work Šampinjonu Derība (The Mushroom Testament). She is now married to a Turkish poet and says that she will publish further work under her married name.

She has converted to the Islamic religion in 2011, married a Turkish writer, Ahmet Kot, and lives in Turkey and Latvia.

=== Books ===
- 2002: Šampinjonu Derība (The Champignons Testament)
  2002 Literature of the Year Award
- 2002: Patiesu dzīves stāstu ducis (A Dozen True Life Stories)
- 2008: BrāliBrāli: balsu burvji brāļi Kokari (about twin brothers Gido Kokars and Imants Kokars)
- 2012: Mana turku kafija (My Turkish Coffee)
- 2020: Cilvēks ar zilo putnu (A Man with the Blue Bird); novel about Anšlavs Eglītis
