= Muktupāvels =

Family name

Muktupāvels (masculine), Muktupāvela (feminine) is a Latvian-language surname.

Valdis Muktupāvels put forth a plausible hypothesis about the origin of his surname: basing on the traditions of Latvian name formation, it would literally mean "Pavels from Mukti", and the placename Mukti may derive from obsolete Lithuanian word "mukt" for "swampy place".

Notable people with the surname include:

- Laima Muktupāvela (born 1962), Latvian author
- Rūta Muktupāvela (born 1963), Latvian cultorologist, musician, and academic, rector of the Latvian Academy of Culture
- Valdis Muktupāvels (born 1958), ethnomusicologist, composer, musician, teacher, ad art critic
- Zigfrīds Muktupāvels (born 1965) Latvian musician, journalist, radio and TV program host
