= Aizkraukle =

Town and capital of Aizkraukle Municipality, Latvia

- Town
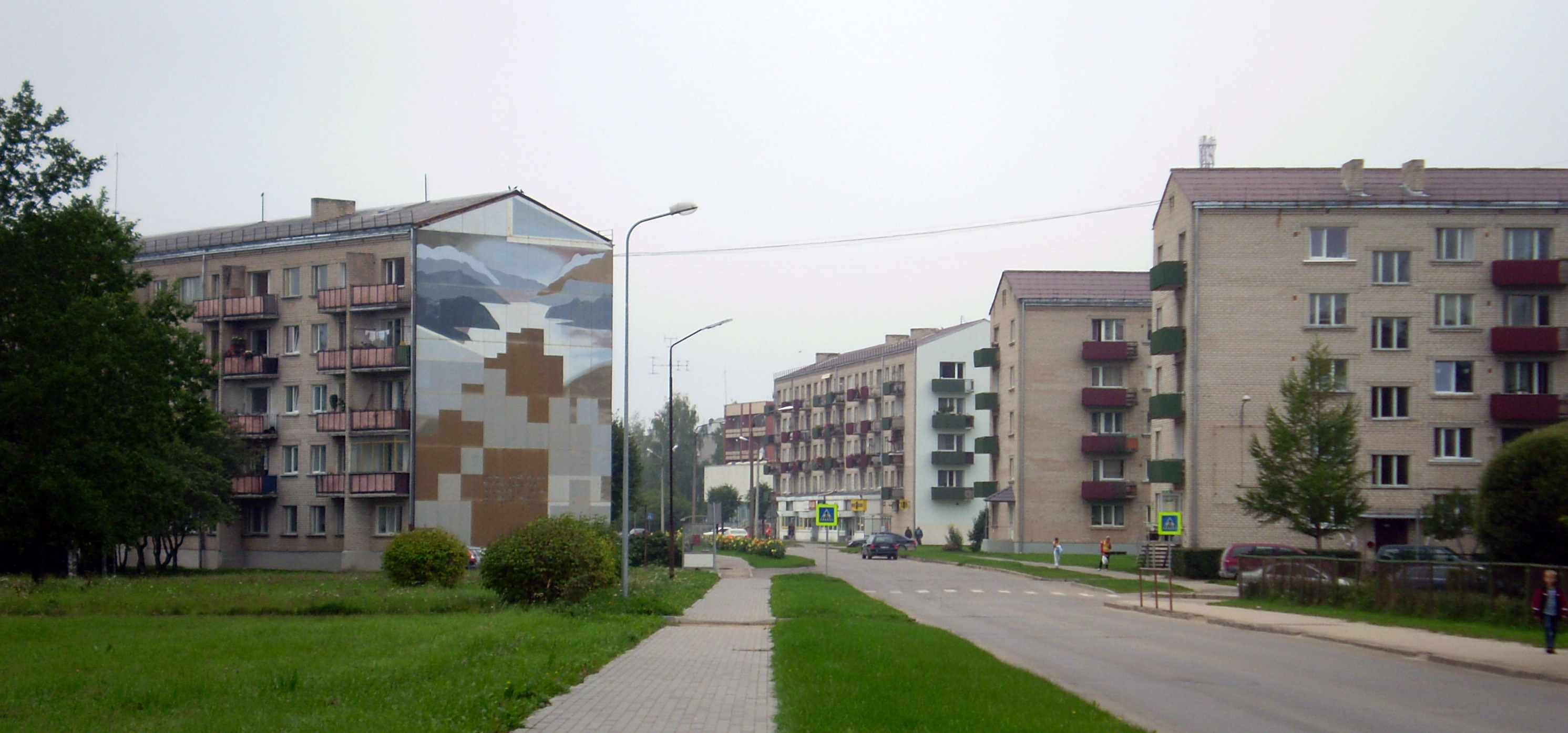

- Flag Coat of arms

- Location in Latvia
- Coordinates: 56°36′15″N 25°15′14″E
- Country: Latvia
- Municipality: Aizkraukle Municipality
- Town rights: 1967

Area
  - Total: 12.93 km^{2} (4.99 sq mi)
  - Land: 8.07 km^{2} (3.12 sq mi)
  - Water: 4.86 km^{2} (1.88 sq mi)

Population (2026)
  - Total: 6,626
  - Density: 821/km^{2} (2,130/sq mi)
- Time zone: UTC+2 (EET)
  - Summer (DST): UTC+3 (EEST)
- Postal code: LV-510(1-3)
- Calling code: +371 651
- Website: www.aizkraukle.lv

Aizkraukle (German: Ascheraden) is a town and the administrative centre of Aizkraukle Municipality in Vidzeme, Latvia. Most of Aizkraukle is situated on the right bank of the Daugava River. As defined by Latvian law, Aizkraukle belongs partially to Vidzeme and partially to Selonia historical regions. The population in 2020 was 7,018.

== History ==
In the second half of the 14th century, the Livonian Order built the Aizkraukle Castle, a few kilometres downstream from the ancient hillfort of Livs. The ruins of the castle still remain today. Before World War I, the settlement that stood near the site of modern-day Aizkraukle was known by its German name of Ascheraden.

The modern town was established in 1961 as a settlement to house the builders of the nearby hydroelectric power plant of Pļaviņas. It was originally called Stučka (or "Стучка", Stuchka and "имени Петра Стучки", imeni Petra Stuchki in Russian), for Pēteris Stučka, a Latvian communist. Town status was granted to it in 1967, which is also when it became the administrative center of Stučkas district. In 1990, it was renamed as Aizkraukle, after the nearest railway station. The name literally means "beyond the Kraukle River."

== Economy ==
General industries in the area include power generation, woodworking, printing, and agriculture.

In 2004, Aizkraukle was awarded "The tidiest town in Latvia 2004" in its size group.

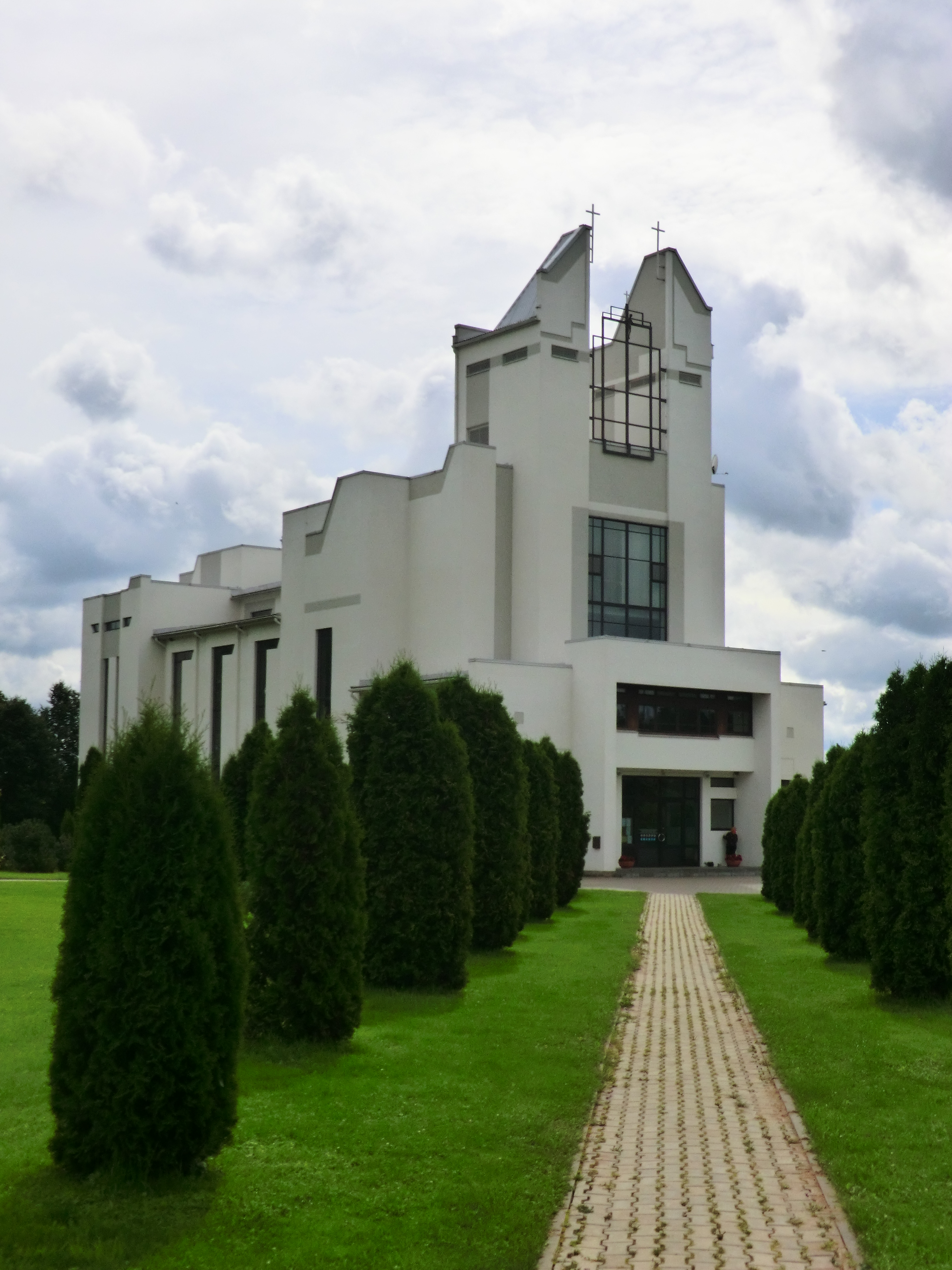
Aizkraukle Saint Thérèse of the Child Jesus Roman Catholic Church

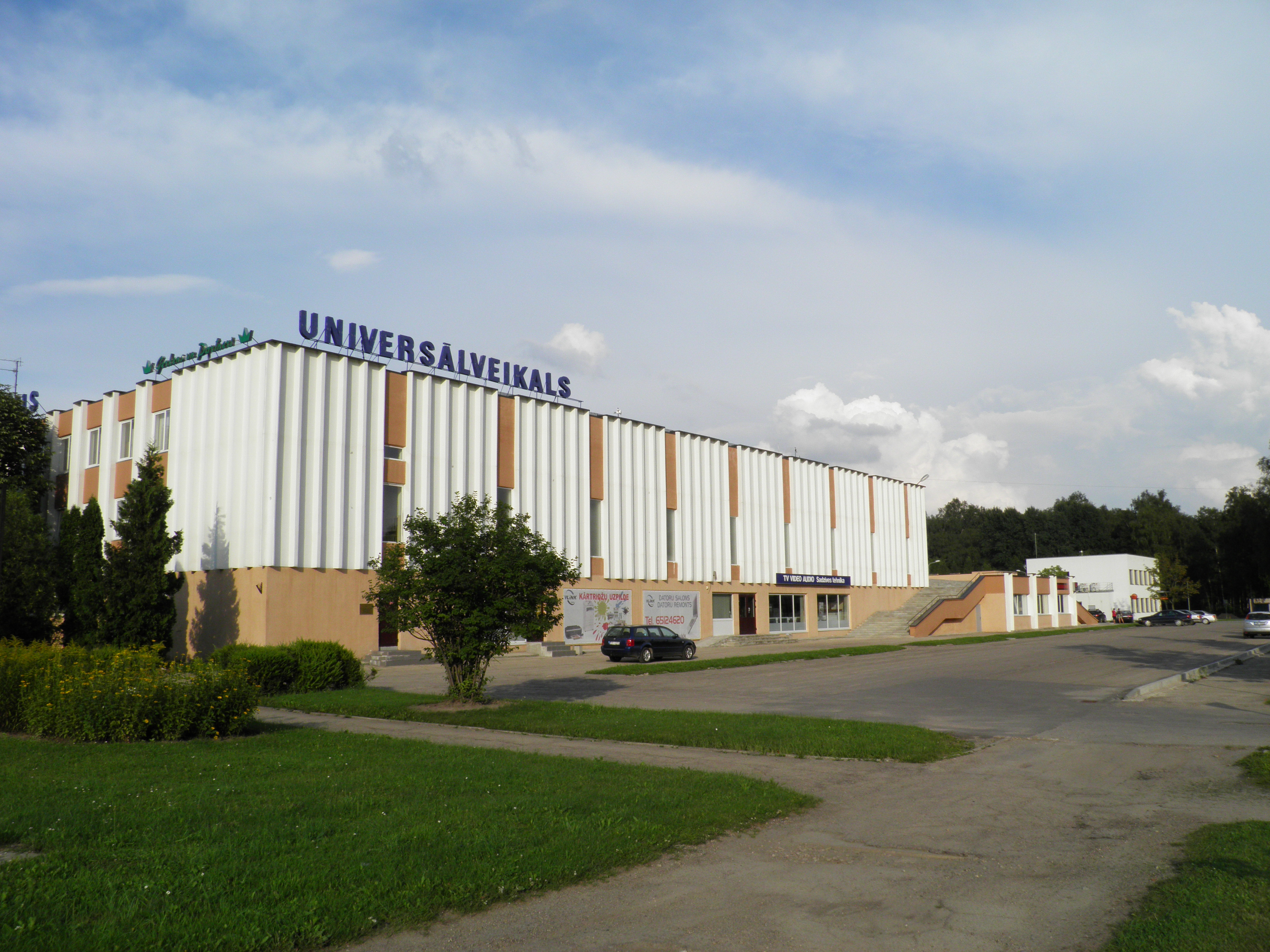
Soviet-era supermarket

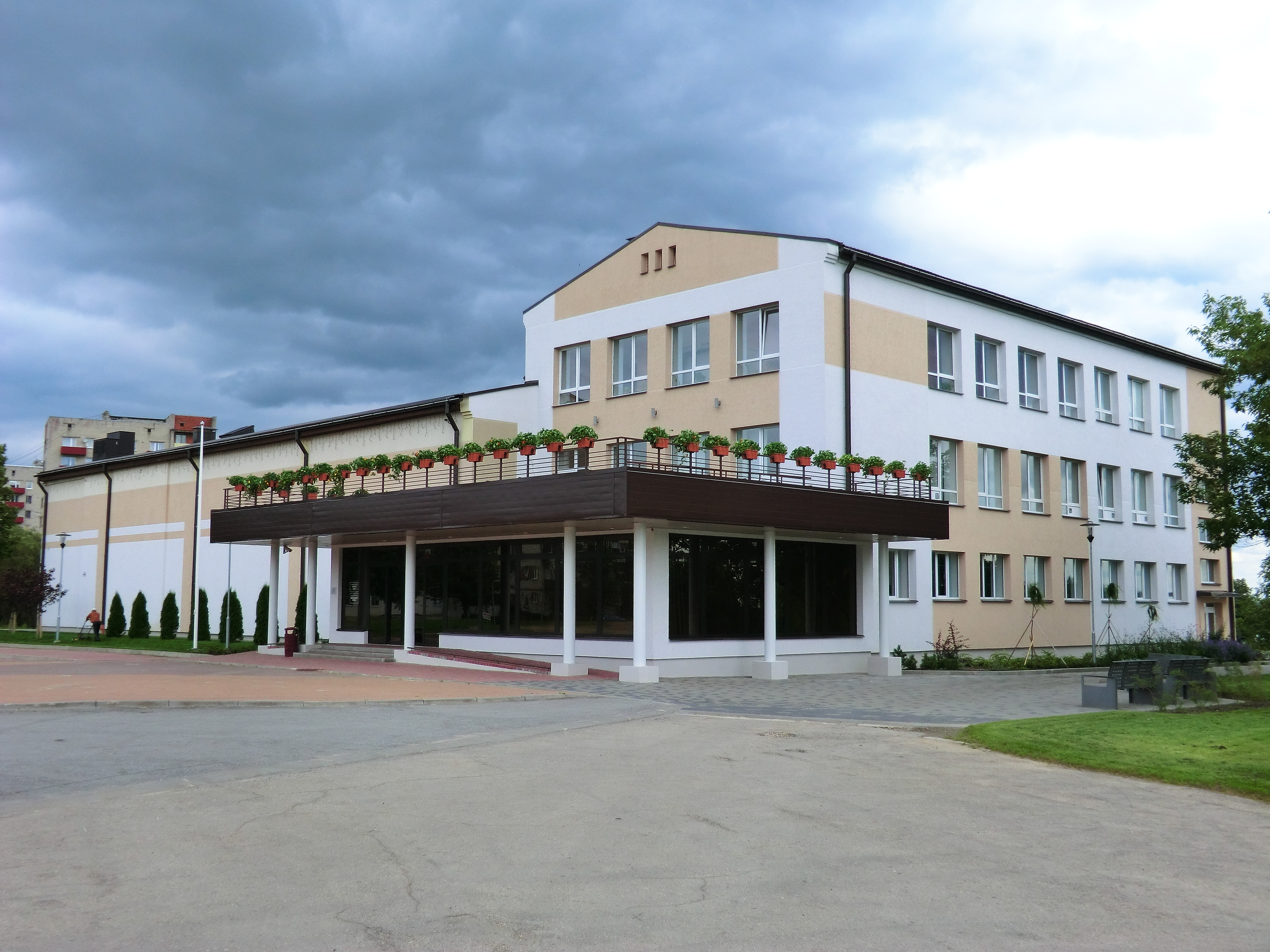
Aizkraukle Society house

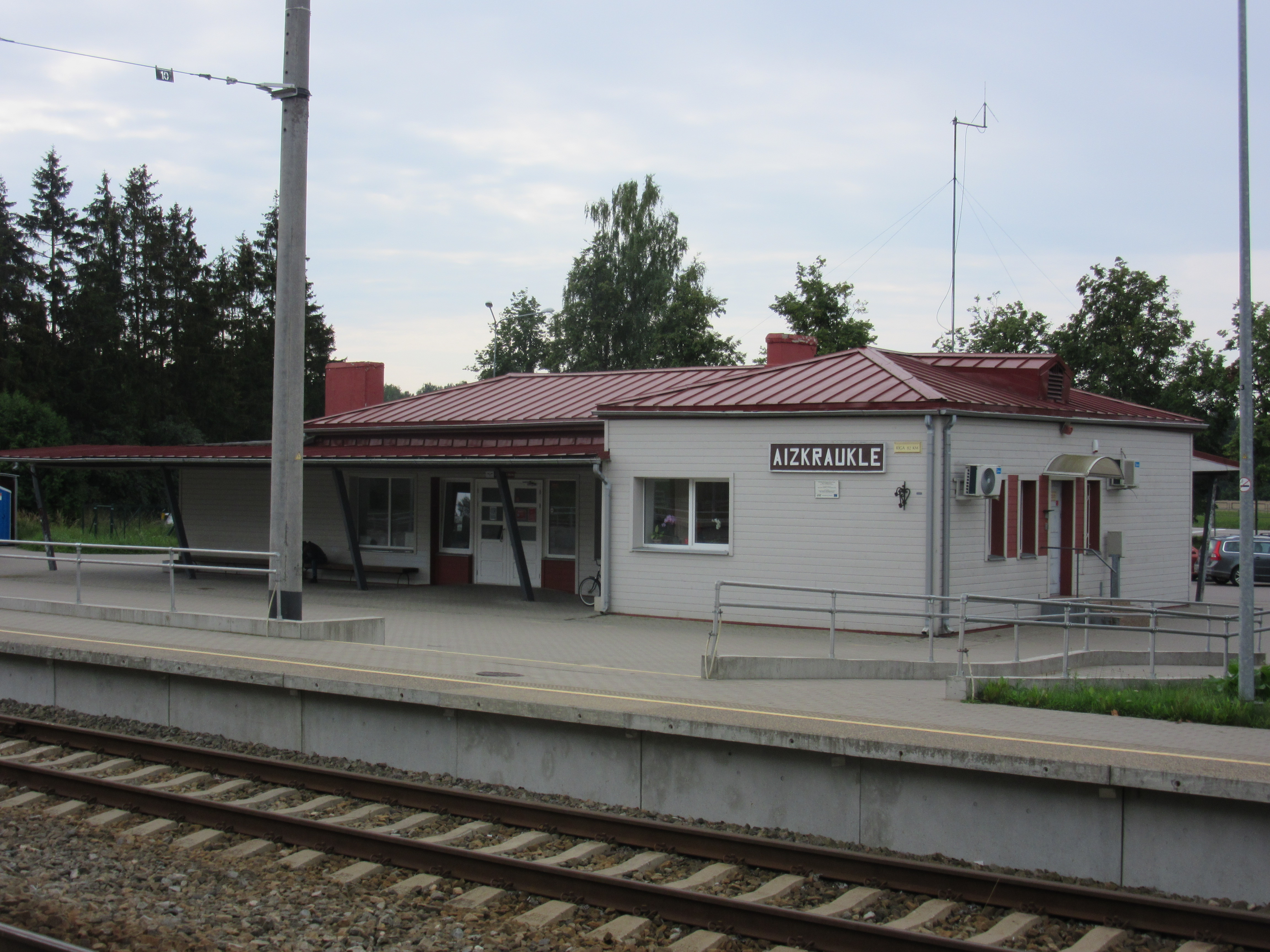
Railway station

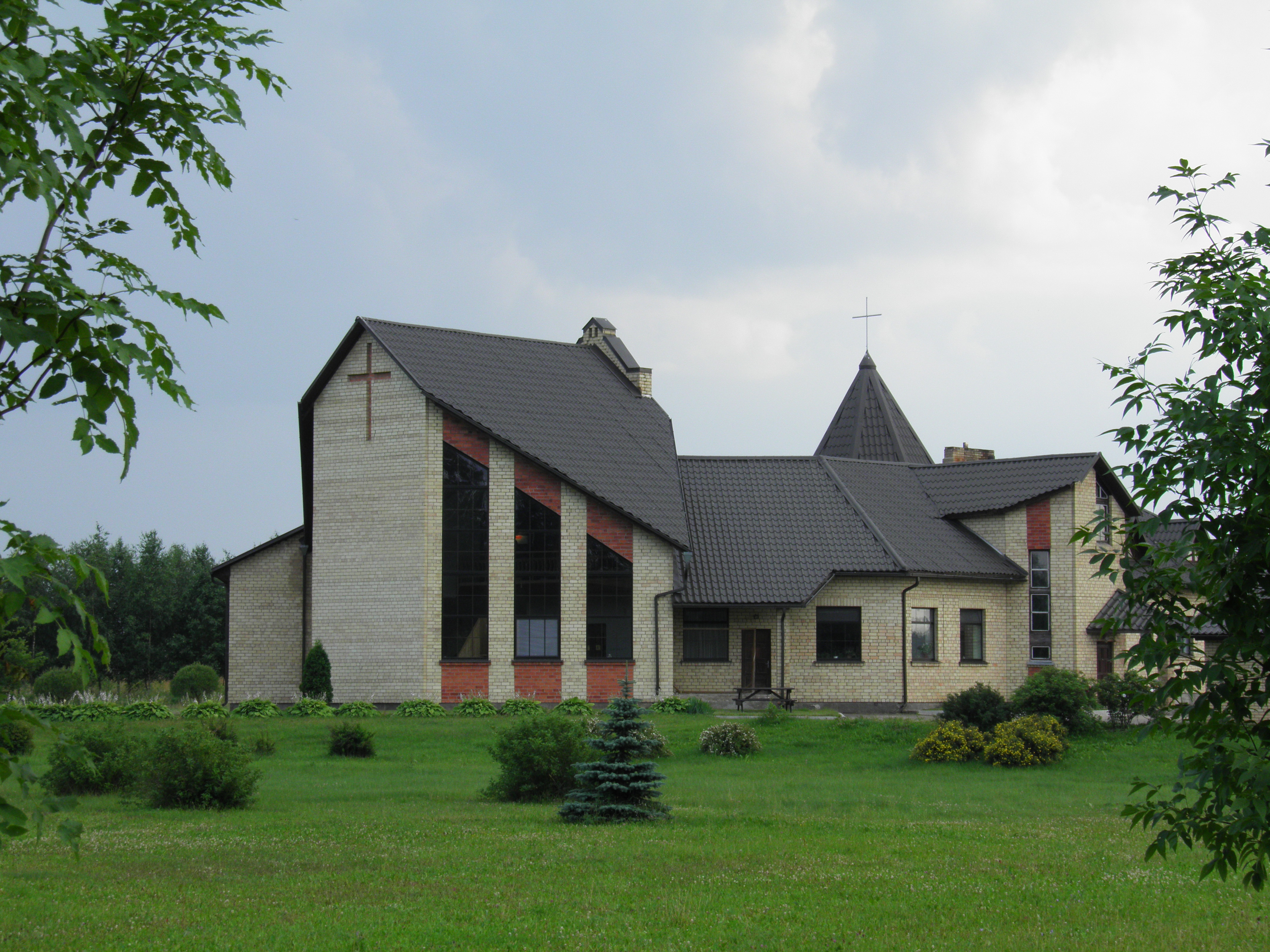
Lutheran church of Christ Power in Aizkraukle

== Notable people ==
- Aigars Apinis (born 1973), athlete, medallist in four Summer Paralympics games
- Ivars Deinis (born 1977), luger, competed at the 2002 Winter Olympics
- Laura Igaune (born 1988), athlete, she specializes in the discus throw and hammer throw.
- Kristers Gudļevskis (born 1992), ice hockey player
- Elvis Stuglis (born 1993), footballer, played over 260 games and 10 for Latvia
- Ingars Stuglis (born 1996), footballer, played over 230 games and 1 for Latvia

== See also ==
- Aizkraukle Station

== Citations and references ==
=== Cited sources ===
- Е. М. Поспелов (Ye. M. Pospelov). "Имена городов: вчера и сегодня (1917–1992). Топонимический словарь." City Names: Yesterday and Today (1917–1992). Toponymic Dictionary." Москва, "Русские словари", 1993.
- Latvijas PSR Augstakās Padomes Prezidija Padomju Darba Jautājumu Daļa. Latvijas PSR Administratīvi Teritoriālais Iedalījums. 1978. gads. Izdevnieciba "Liesma", Riga 1978.
