= Alotene Station =

Railway station in Latvia

Alotene
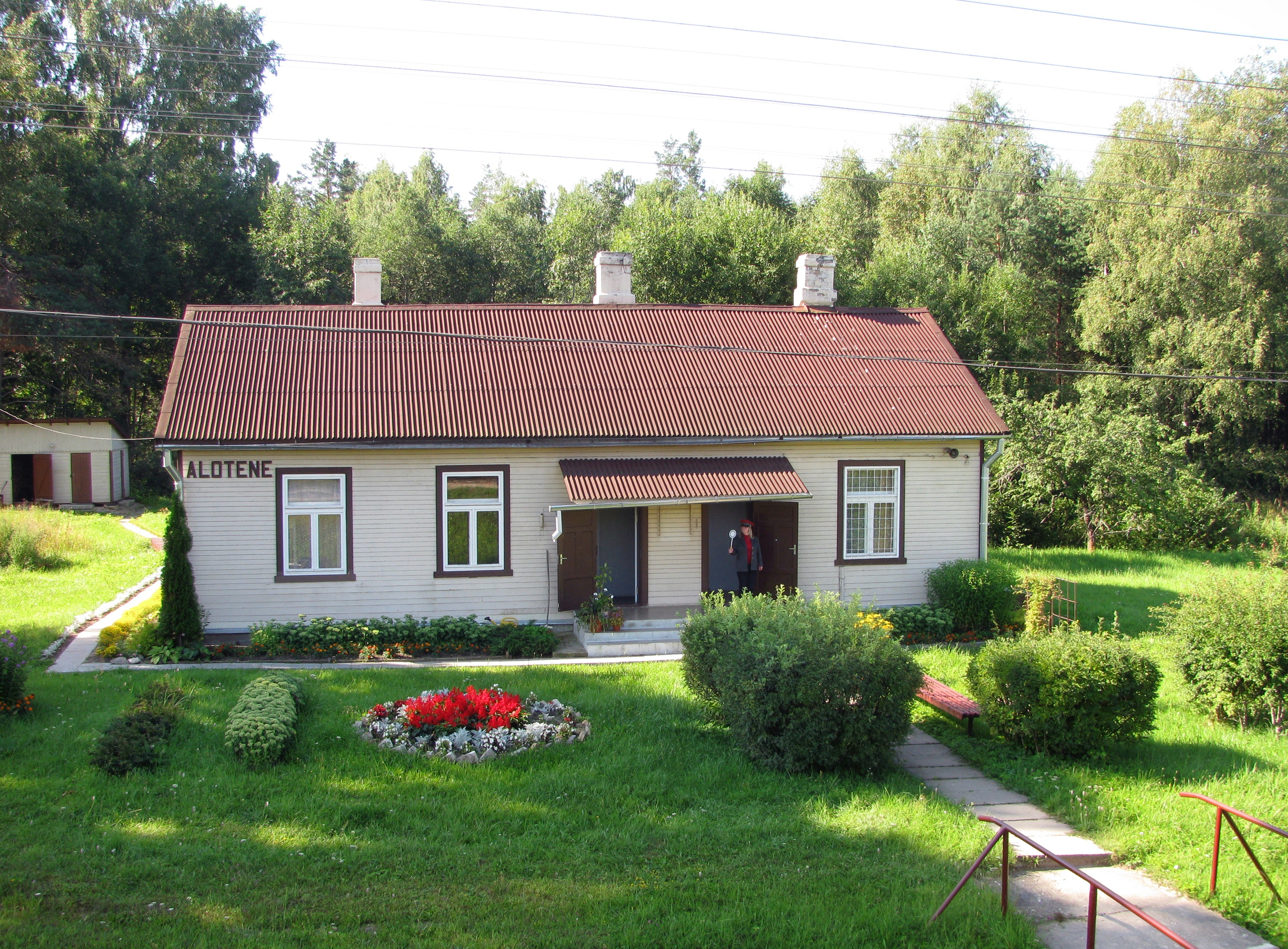
- Station building

General information
- Location: Alotene, Klintaine Parish, Pļaviņas Municipality
- Coordinates: 56°38′0.98″N 25°34′44.23″E
- Platforms: 1
- Tracks: 2

History
- Opened: 1930
- Former names: Klintene (1930-1942)

Services
Preceding station	LDz	Following station
Koknese towards Riga	Riga–Daugavpils	Pļaviņas towards Daugavpils
Location
- Location within Latvia railways

Alotene Station is a railway station on the Riga – Daugavpils Railway.
