= Koknese Station =

Railway station in Latvia

Koknese
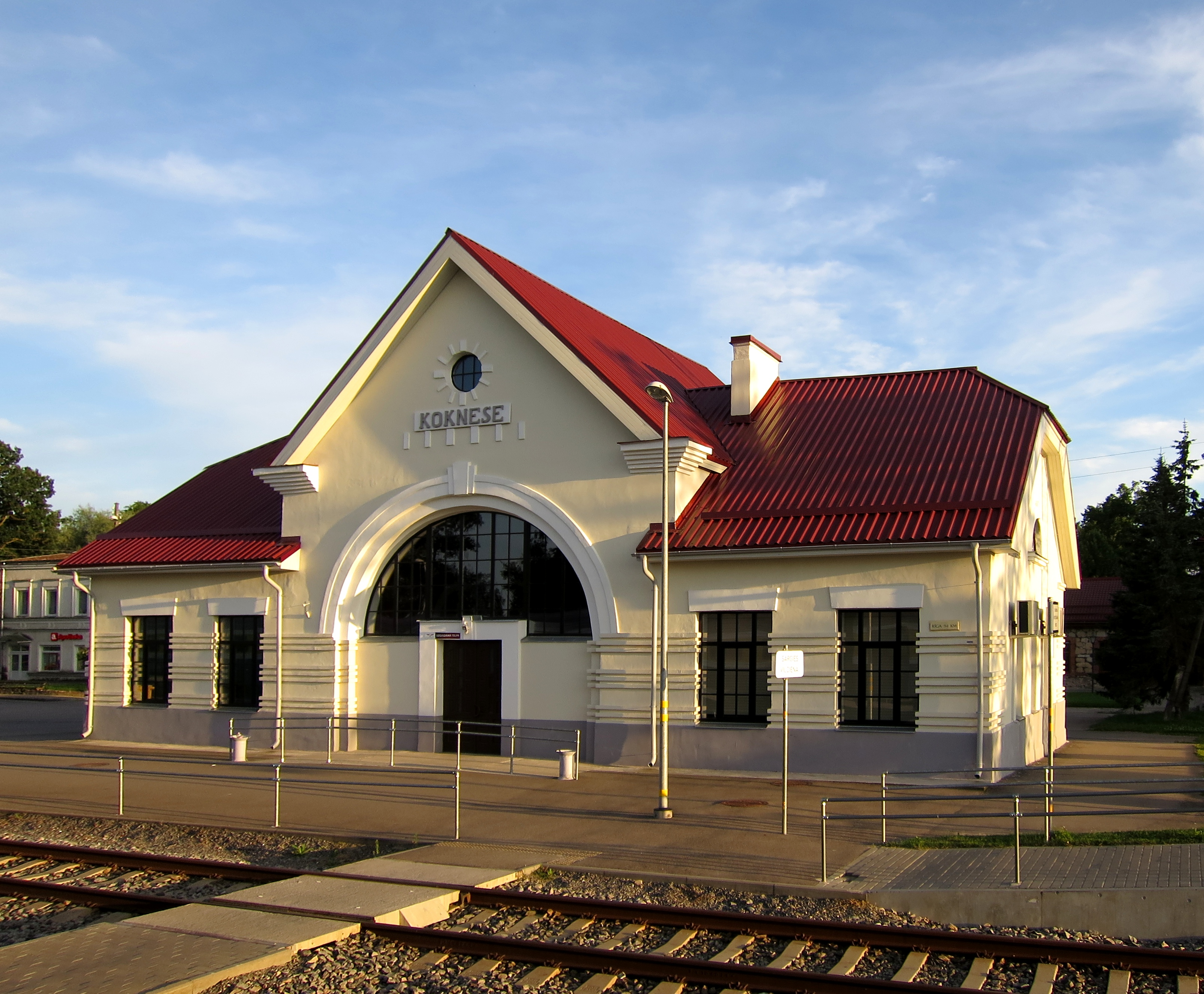

General information
- Location: Stacija Koknese, Koknese, Aizkraukle Municipality
- Coordinates: 56°39′1.89″N 25°26′23.52″E
- Platforms: 2

History
- Opened: 1861
- Former names: Kokenhusen

Services
Preceding station	LDz	Following station
Aizkraukle towards Riga	Riga–Daugavpils	Alotene towards Daugavpils
Location
- Location within Latvia railways

Koknese Station is a railway station on the Riga – Daugavpils Railway.
