= Lejasciems Parish =

Parish of Latvia

- parish of Latvia
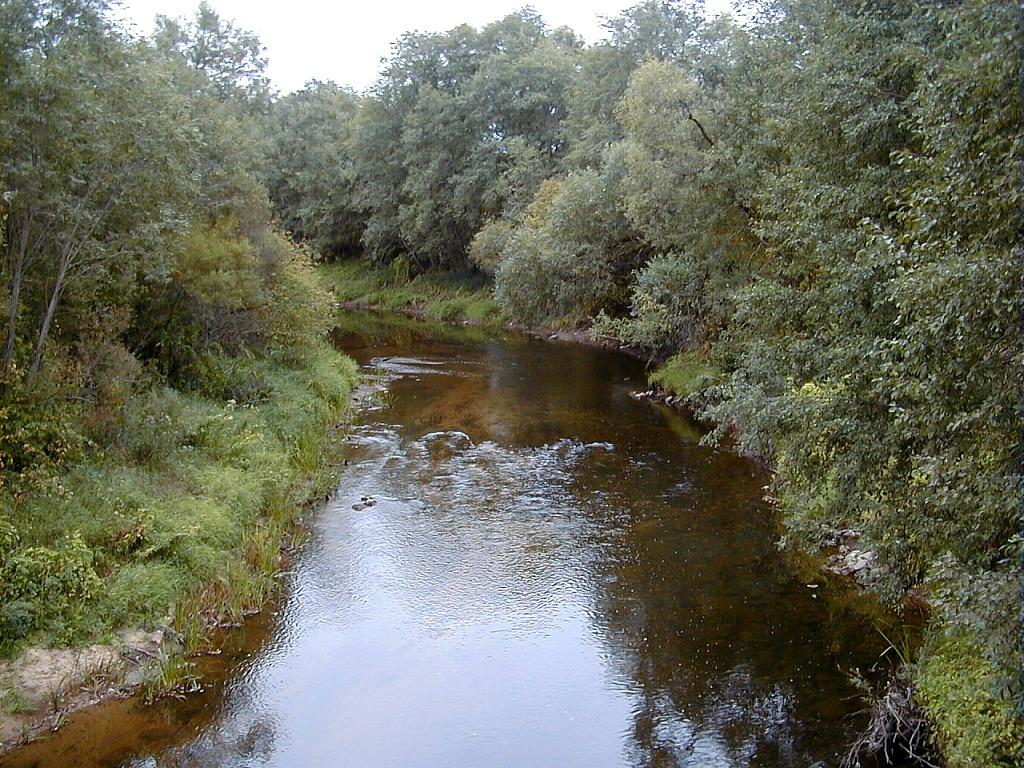

- Coat of arms

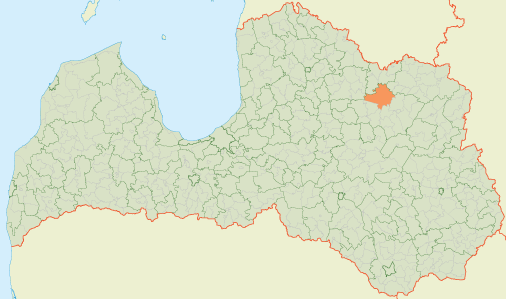
- 57°17′56″N 26°30′16″E

- Location within Latvia
- Country: Latvia

Area
  - Total: 337.76 km^{2} (130.41 sq mi)
  - Land: 328.08 km^{2} (126.67 sq mi)
  - Water: 9.68 km^{2} (3.74 sq mi)

Population (1 January 2026)
  - Total: 1,266
  - Density: 3.859/km^{2} (9.994/sq mi)

Lejasciems Parish (Latvian: Lejasciema pagasts) is an administrative territorial entity of Gulbene Municipality, Latvia. The central village in the parish is Lejasciems.

== Towns, villages and settlements of Lejasciems Parish ==
- Cinci
- Čipati
- Dūre
- Jānūži
- Ķilpani
- Krampani
- Lapati
- Lejasciems
- Mālumuiža
- Salaki
- Salmaņi
- Sinole
- Umari
- Zvārtavi
