= Pļaviņas Station =

Railway station in Latvia

Pļaviņas
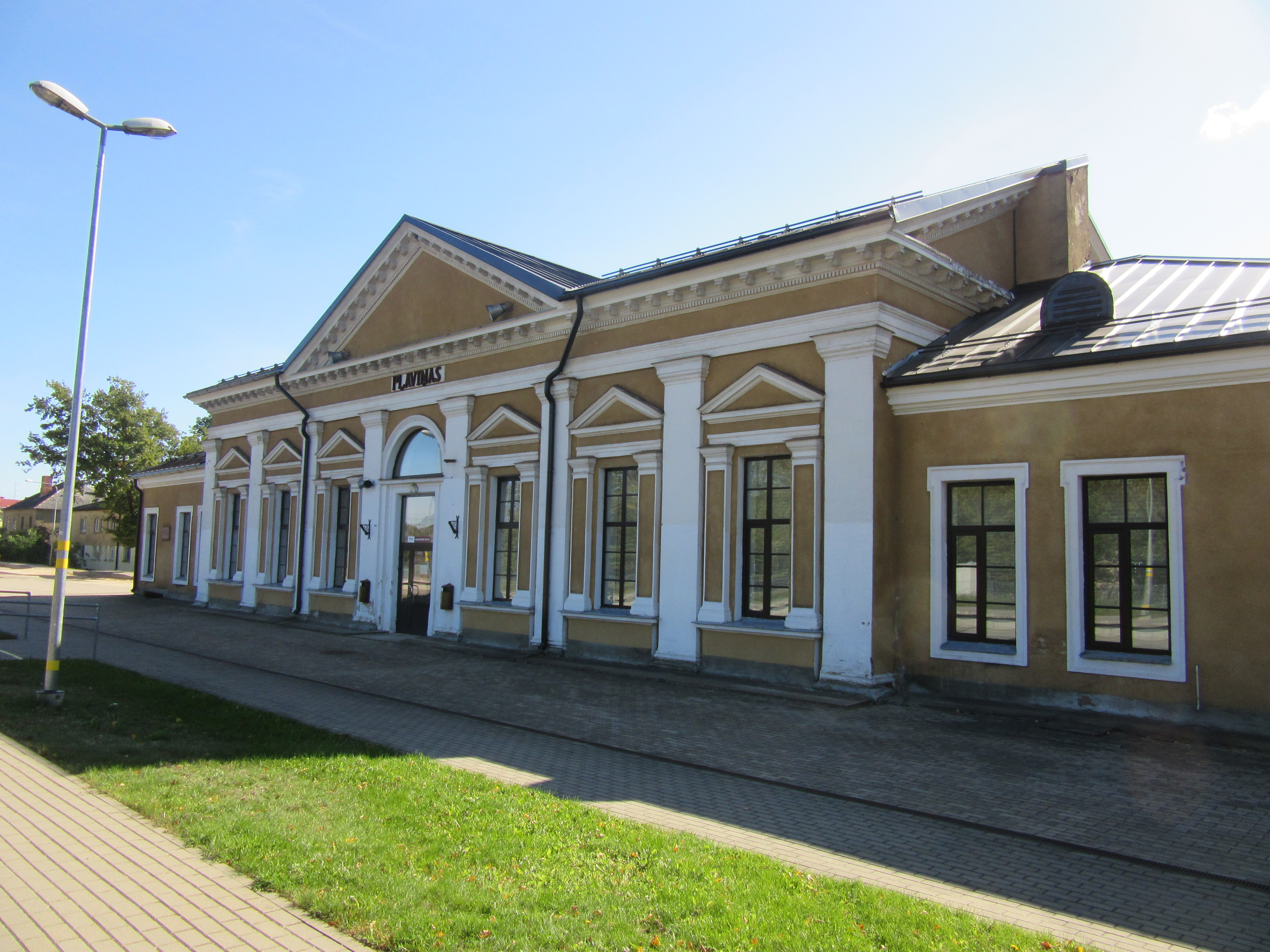
- Pļaviņas station building

General information
- Location: Stacijas street 2, Pļaviņas; Aizkraukle Municipality
- Coordinates: 56°37′1.5″N 25°42′59.1″E

History
- Opened: 1861
- Rebuilt: 1950
- Former names: Stockmannshof

Services
Preceding station	LDz	Following station
Alotene towards Riga	Riga–Daugavpils	Krustpils towards Daugavpils
through to Riga–Daugavpils	Pļaviņas–Gulbene	Jaunkalsnava towards Gulbene
Location
- Location within Latvia railways

Pļaviņas Station is a railway station on the Riga – Daugavpils Railway.
