= Imants Kokars =

Latvian pedagogue and conductor

- Born: 16 August 1921; Gulbene, Latvia
- Died: 24 November 2011 (aged 90) Riga, Latvia
- Occupation: Conductor

Imants Kokars (16 August 1921 – 24 November 2011) was a Latvian pedagogue and conductor. His twin brother Gido Kokars was also a conductor. Imants Kokar has been chief conductor of several Latvian Song and Dance Festivals and initiated the Nordic-Baltic Choral Festival in 1995.

On 12 April 1995 Imants Kokars was awarded the Order of the Three Stars, third class.
