= Aizkraukle Station =

Railway station in Latvia

Aizkraukle
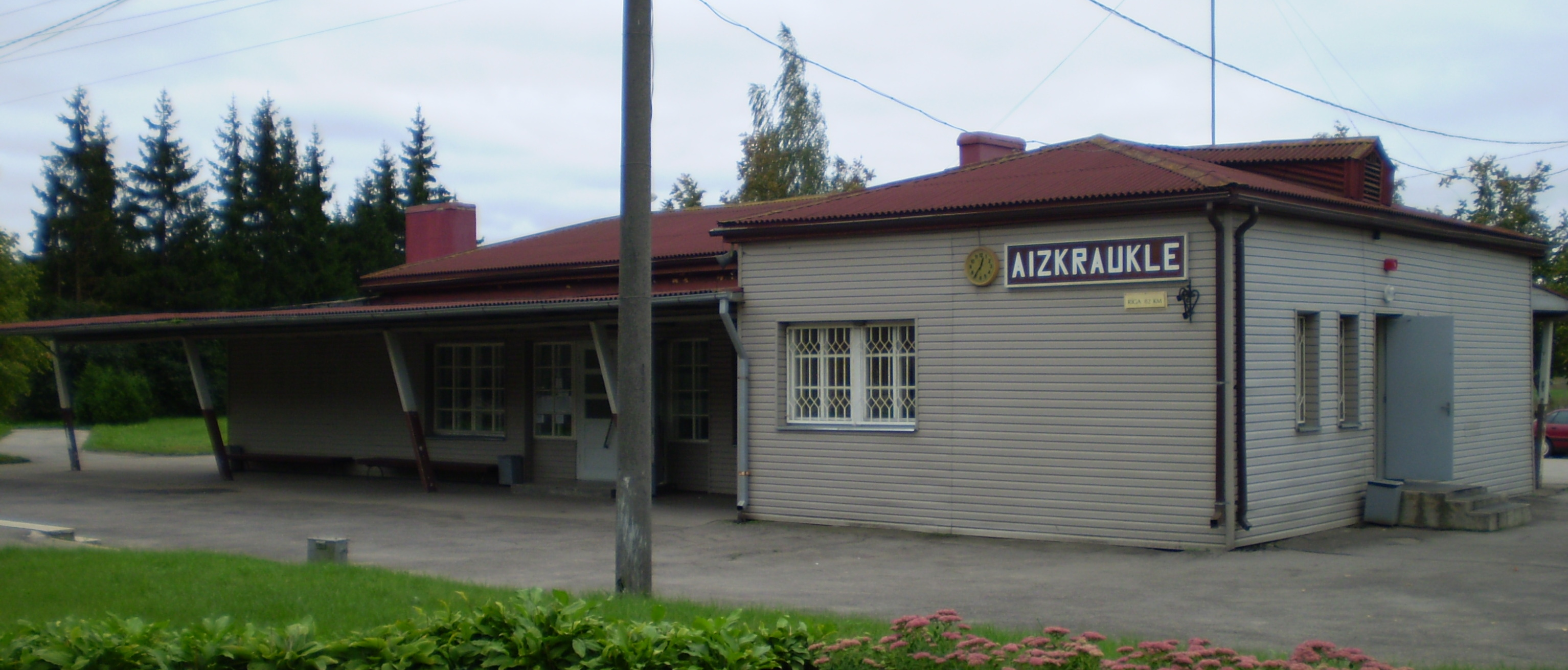

General information
- Location: Aizkraukle parish, Aizkraukle Municipality
- Coordinates: 56°37′22.31″N 25°16′26.24″E
- Platforms: 3
- Tracks: 5

History
- Opened: 1919
- Former names: Stepiņi

Services
| Preceding station | LDz | Following station |
|---|---|---|
| Muldakmens towards Riga | Riga–Daugavpils | Koknese towards Daugavpils |
Location
- Location within Latvia railways

Aizkraukle Station is a railway station on the Riga – Daugavpils Railway.

== Image gallery ==
=== Railway tracks after reconstruction ===
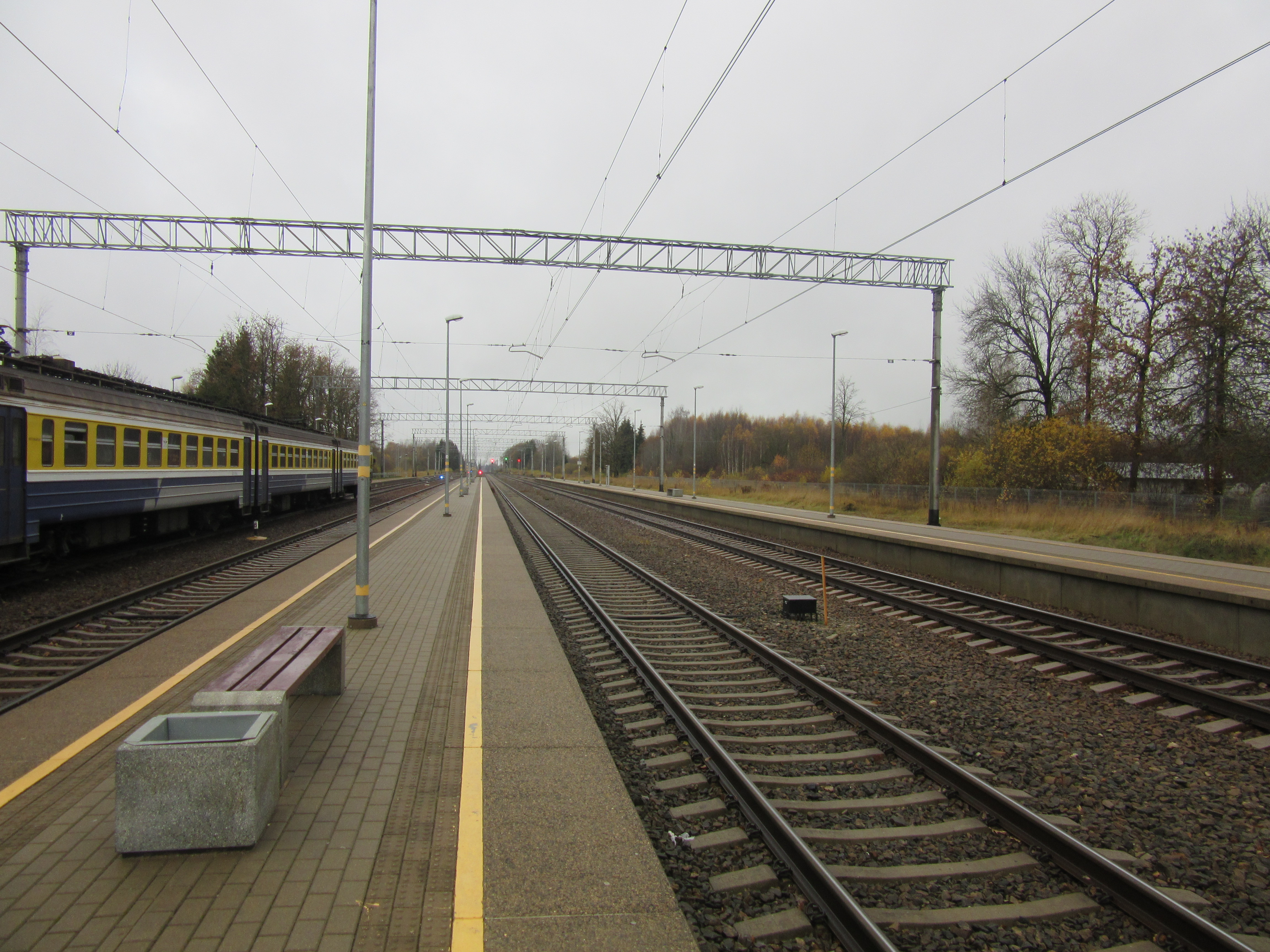
Rail tracks in the direction of Riga

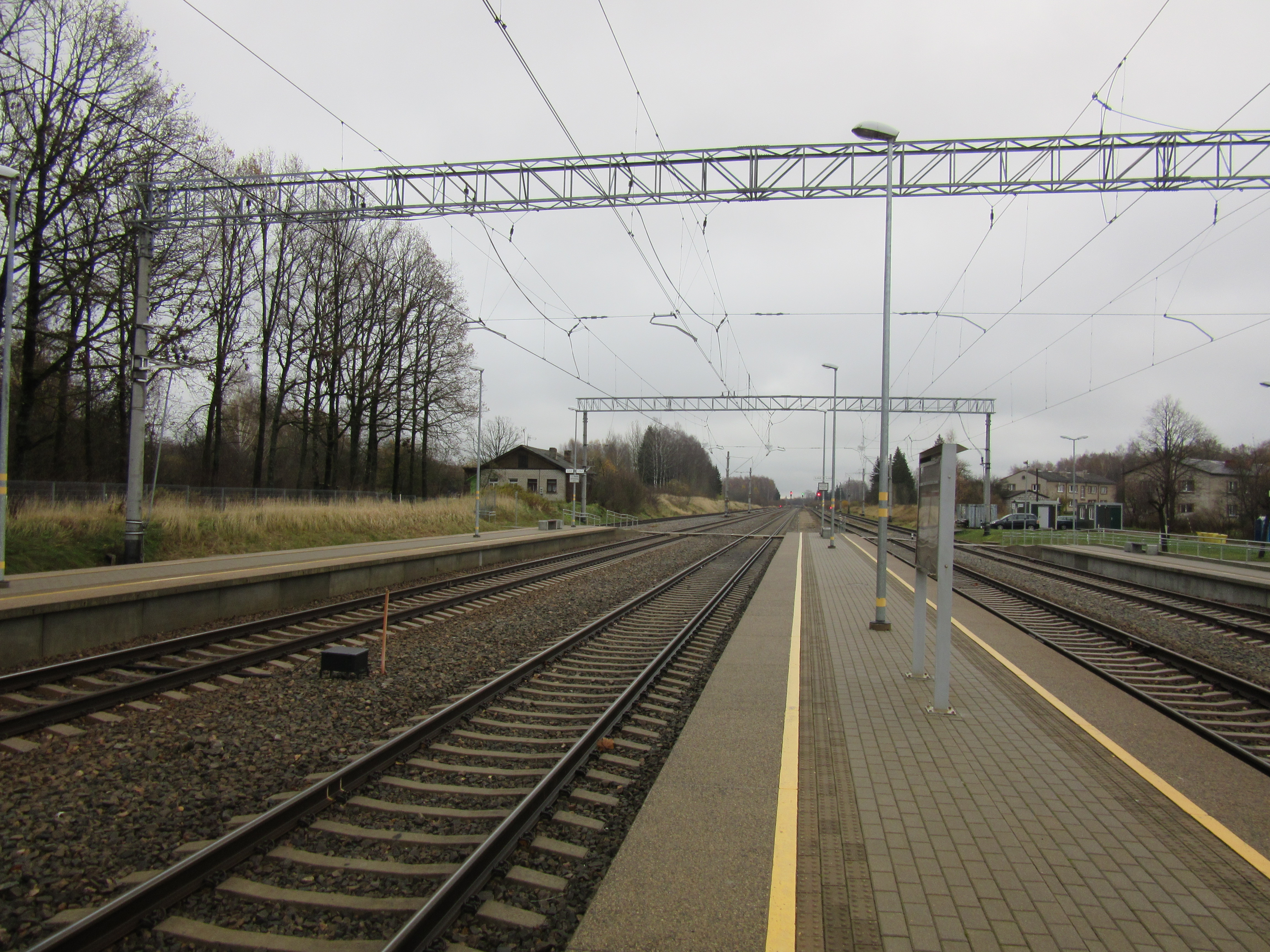
Railway tracks in the direction of Krustpils, where the power line ends very soon

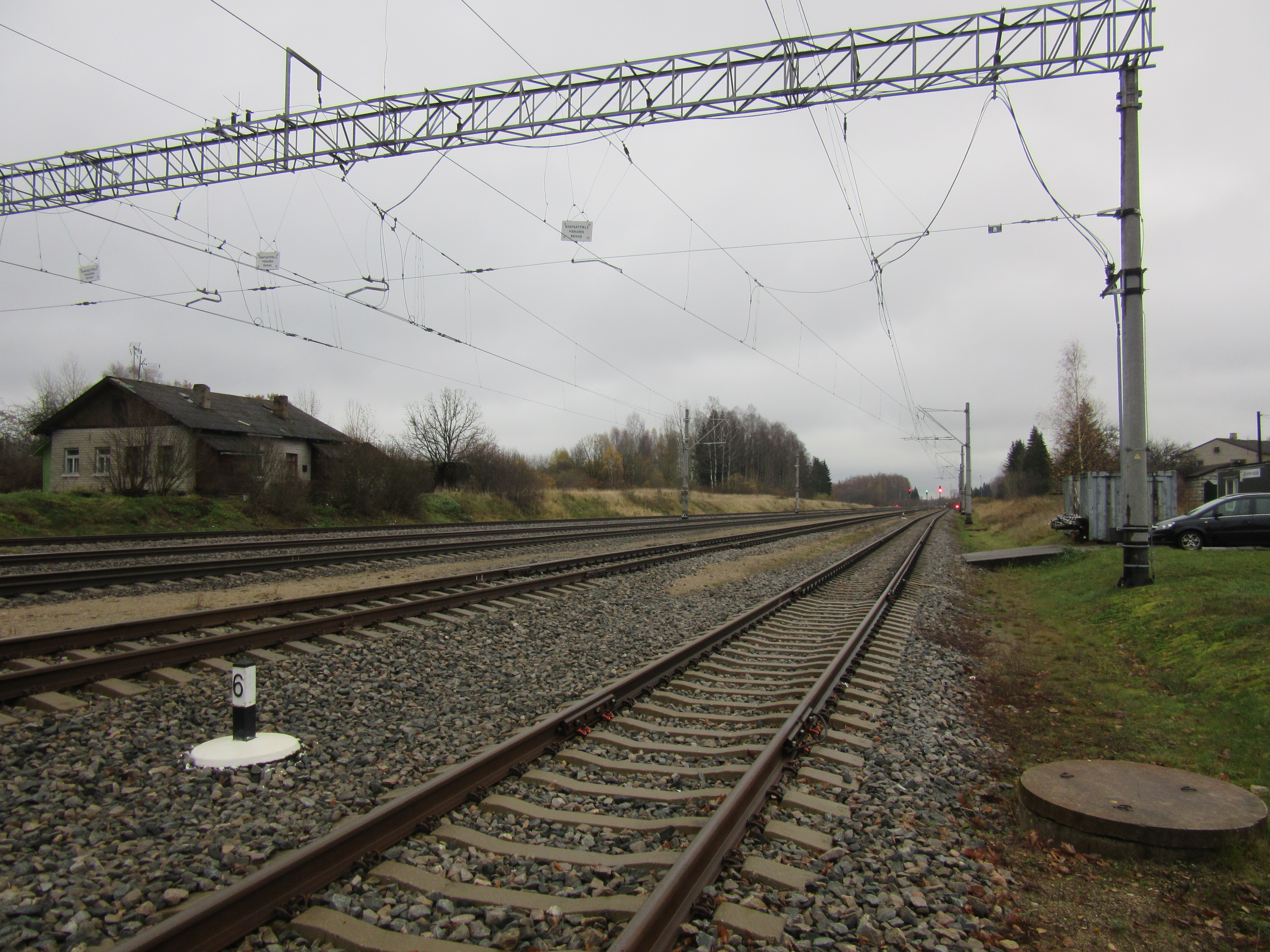
The end of the power line (View towards Krustpils)
