= Gido Kokars =

Latvian conductor

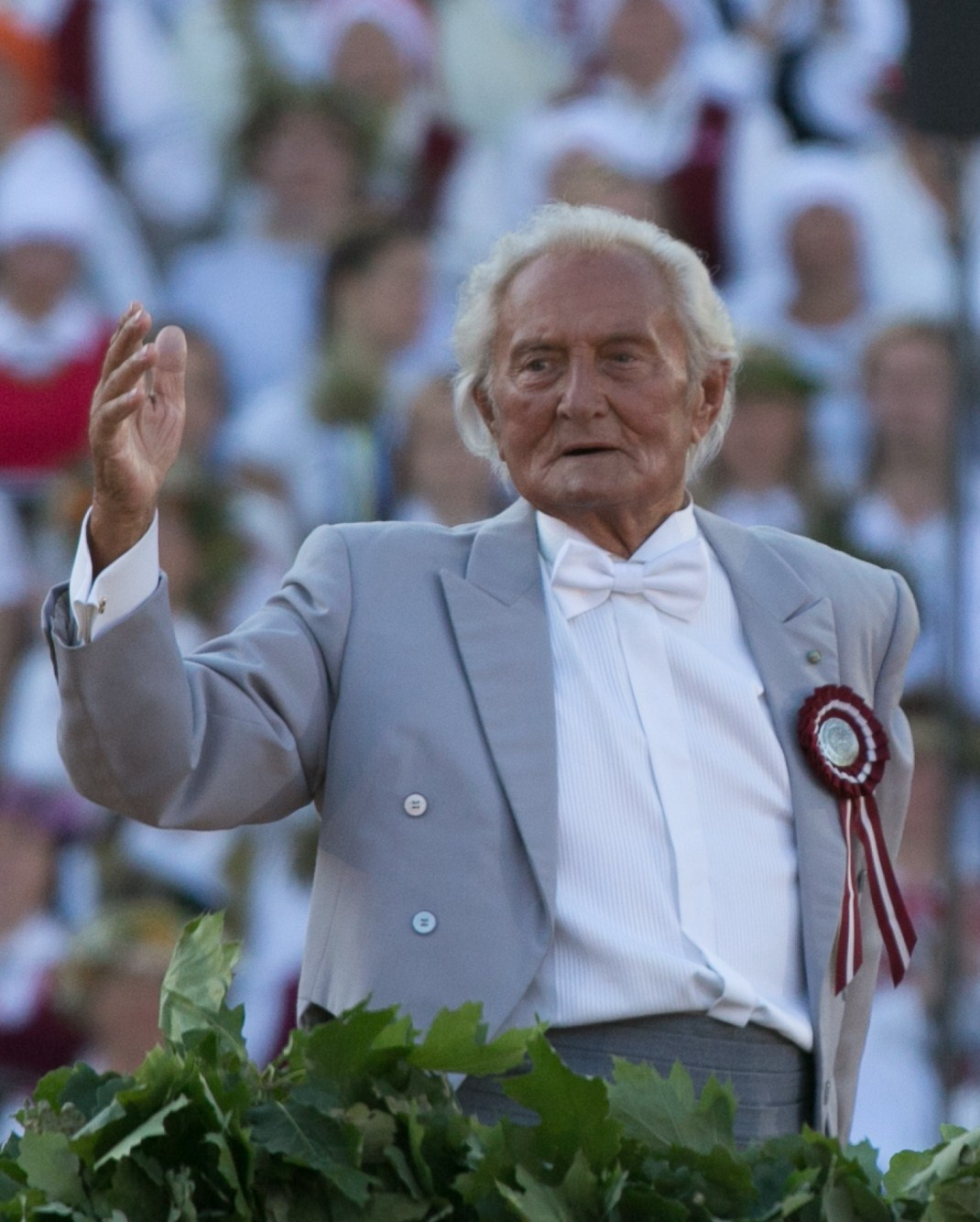

Background information
- Born: August 16, 1921; Gulbene, Latvia
- Died: March 9, 2017 (aged 95) Riga, Latvia
- Occupation: Conductor

Gido Kokars (16 August 1921 – 10 March 2017) was a Latvian conductor. He was the twin brother of Imants Kokars, also a conductor.
