= Dzirkstele =

Latvian newspaper

- Language: Latvian

Dzirkstele is a regional newspaper published in Latvia.
