= Pļaviņas–Gulbene Railway =

Railway built in the 20th century to connect Pļaviņas and Valka

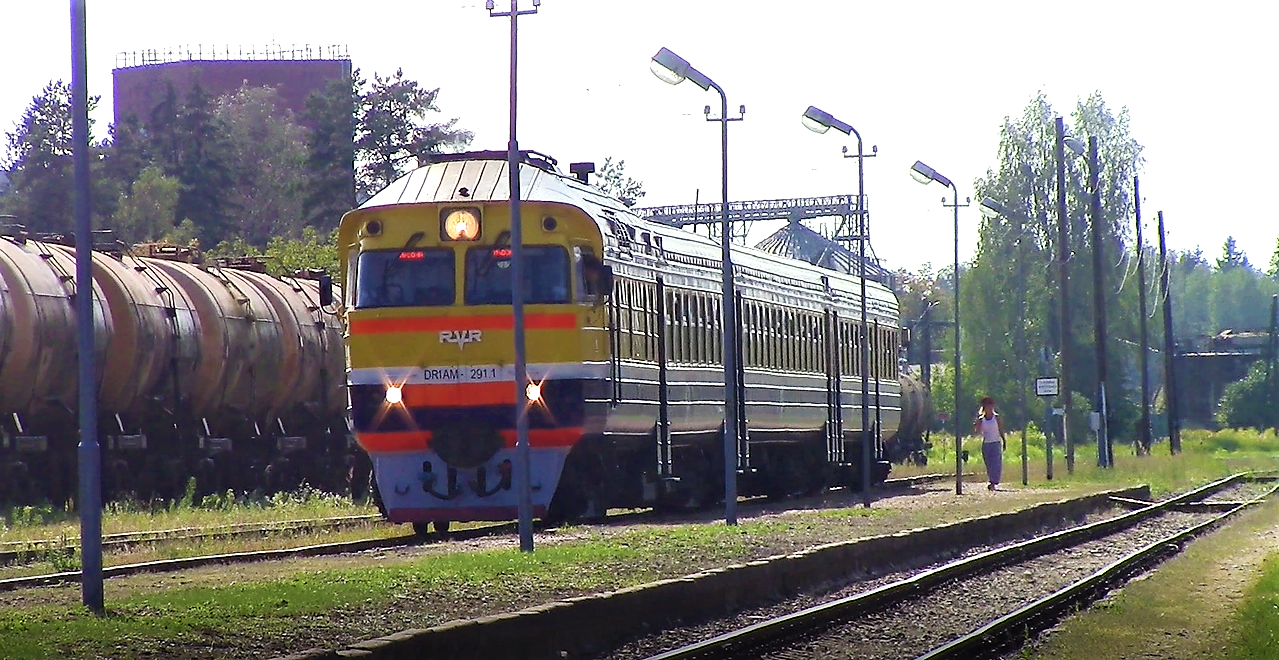
- Passenger train at Jaunkalsnava station

Overview
- Termini: Pļaviņas Station; Gulbene Station

Service
- Operator(s): Latvian Railways

History
- Opened: 1903

Technical
- Line length: 98 km (60.89 mi)
- Track gauge: 1,524 mm (5 ft)

The Pļaviņas–Gulbene Railway is a 98 kilometres (61 mi) long, 1,524 mm (5 ft) gauge railway built in 20th century beginning to connect Pļaviņas and Valka. The railway was originally part of a 750 mm (2 ft 5 1/2 in) narrow gauge railway, but was converted to the current gauge during World War I.

== See also ==
Railway lines in Latvia in 2016.

- Rail transport in Latvia
- History of rail transport in Latvia

== Bibliography ==
- Altbergs, T.; Augustāne, K.; Pētersone, I. (2009). Dzelzceļi Latvijā [Railways in Latvia] (in Latvian). Jumava. ISBN 978-9984-38-698-0.
