= Daugavpils Municipality =

Coordinates: 55°53′N 26°32′E

Daugavpils Municipality Daugavpils novads
- Former municipality
- Flag Coat of arms

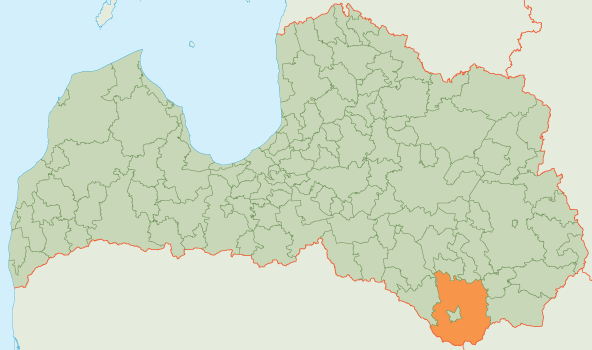
- Country: Latvia
- Formed: 2009
- Centre: Daugavpils (extraterritorially)

Government
  - Council Chair: Arvīds Kucins (Daugavpils Municipality Party)

Area
  - Total: 1,876.06 km^{2} (724.35 sq mi)
  - Land: 1,793.90 km^{2} (692.63 sq mi)
  - Water: 82.16 km^{2} (31.72 sq mi)

Population (2021)
  - Total: 19,553
  - Density: 10.900/km^{2} (28.230/sq mi)
- Website: www.daugavpilsnovads.lv

Daugavpils Municipality (Latvian: Daugavpils novads) was a municipality in Latgale, Latvia from 2009 to 2021.

It was formed in 2009 by merging Ambeļi parish, Biķernieki parish, Demene parish, Dubna parish, Kalkūne parish, Kalupe parish, Laucesa parish, Līksna parish, Maļinova parish, Medumi parish, Naujene parish, Nīcgale parish, Saliena parish, Skrudaliena parish, Svente parish, Tabore parish, Vabole parish, Vecsaliena parish and Višķi parish, with the administration located in Daugavpils city, which was not included within the municipality.

After the 2021 reform it merged with Ilūkste Municipality to form the Augšdaugava Municipality within the borders of the former Daugavpils district.

As of 2020, the population was 19,639.

== Demographics ==
=== Ethnic composition ===
As of 1 January 2010 the ethnic composition of the municipality is as follows:

Ethnic group	Number	%
Russians	12182	42,72 %
Latvians	9494	33,29 %
Poles	3673	12,88 %
Belarusians	1898	6,66 %
Ukrainians	411	1,44 %
Others	859	3,01 %

== Twin towns — sister cities ==
Daugavpils Municipality is twinned with:

- Bad Doberan, Germany
- Braslaw, Belarus
- Edineț, Moldova
- Hlybokaye, Belarus
- Ichnia, Ukraine
- Łomża, Poland
- Rokiškis, Lithuania
- Sharkawshchyna, Belarus
- Vitebsk, Belarus
- Zarasai, Lithuania
- Zaraysky District, Russia

== Gallery ==
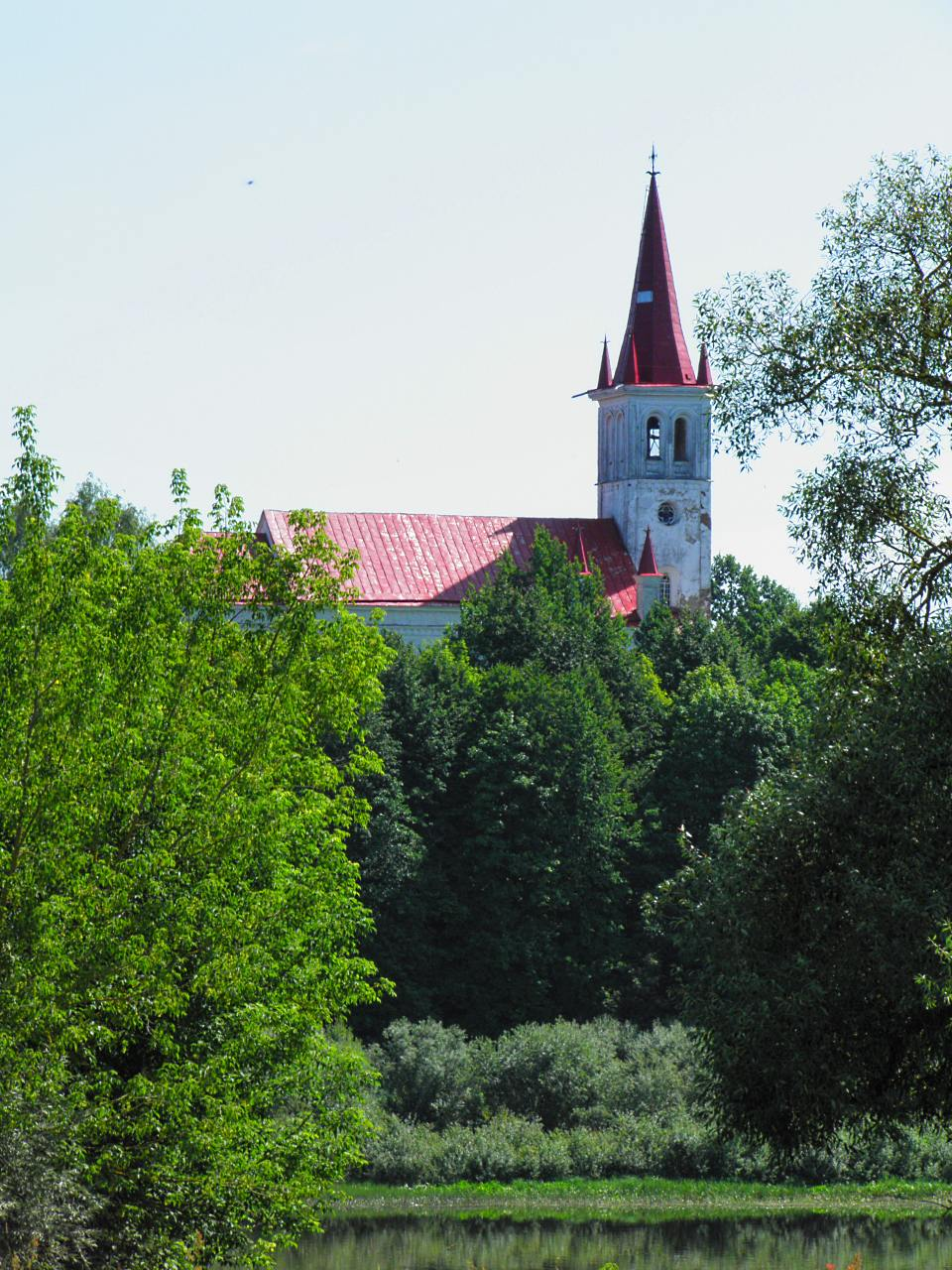
Nīcgale Nativity of the Virgin Mary Roman Catholic Church

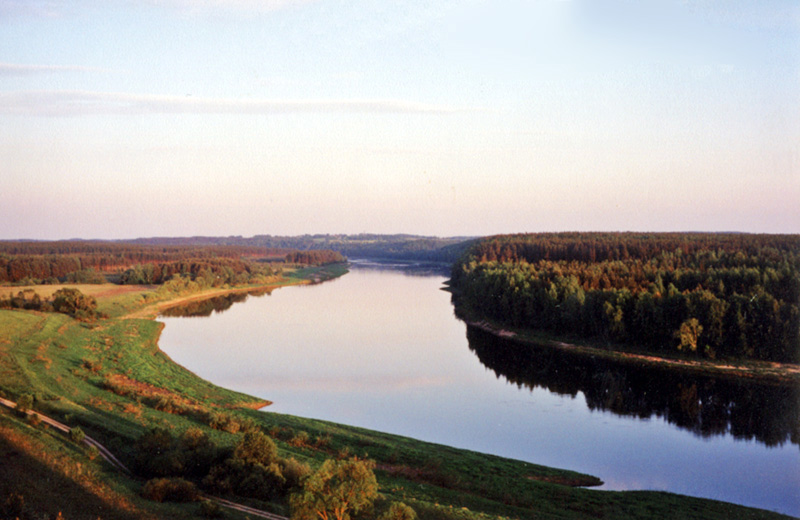
The Daugava River in the Bows of the Daugava Nature Park

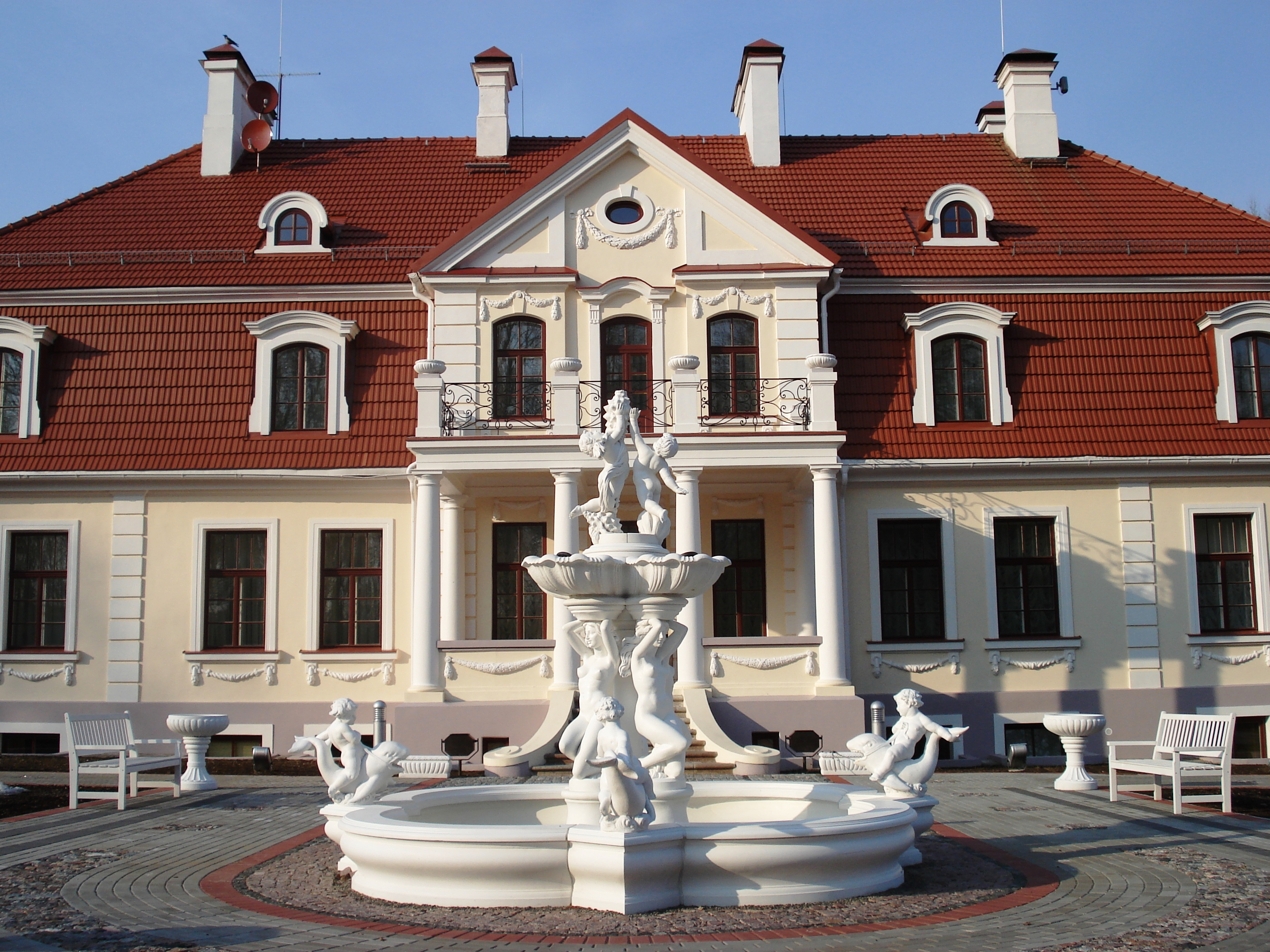
Svente manor

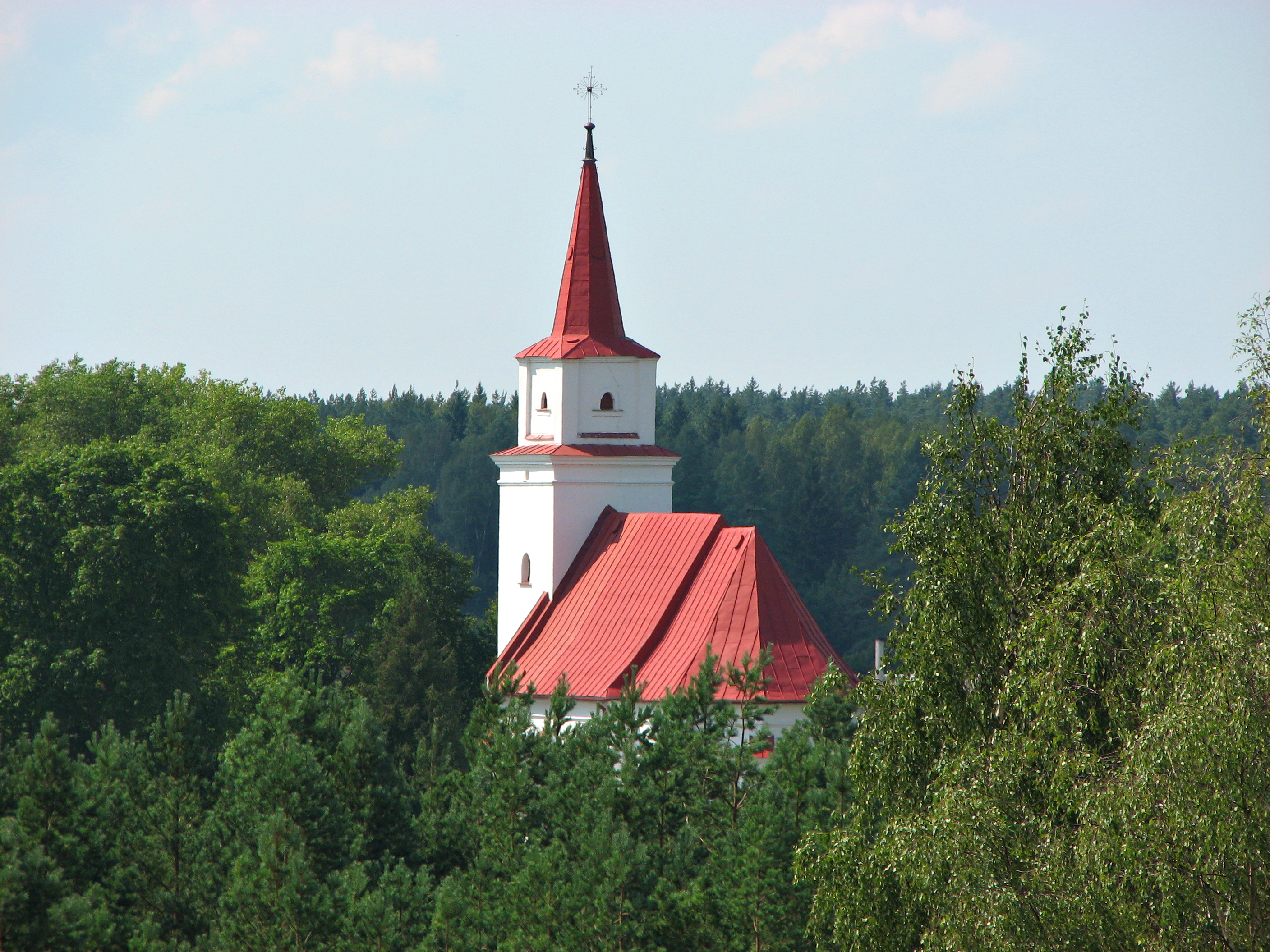
Elerne Roman Catholic (formerly Lutheran) Church, Tabore parish

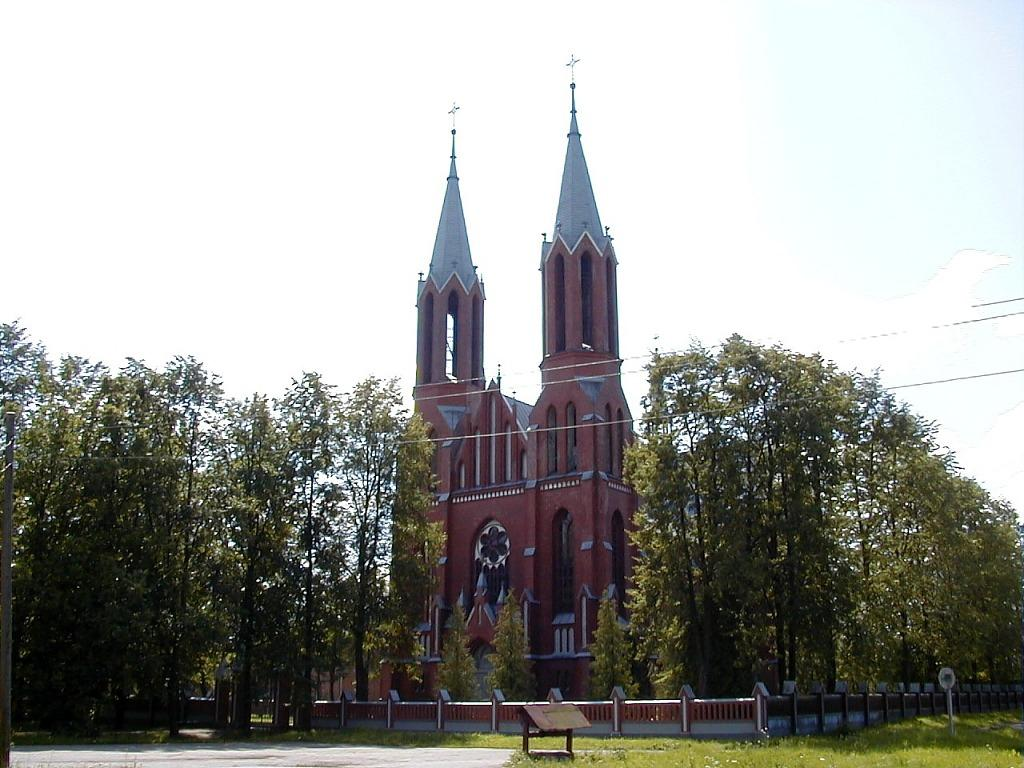
Līksna Sacred Heart of Jesus Roman Catholic Church

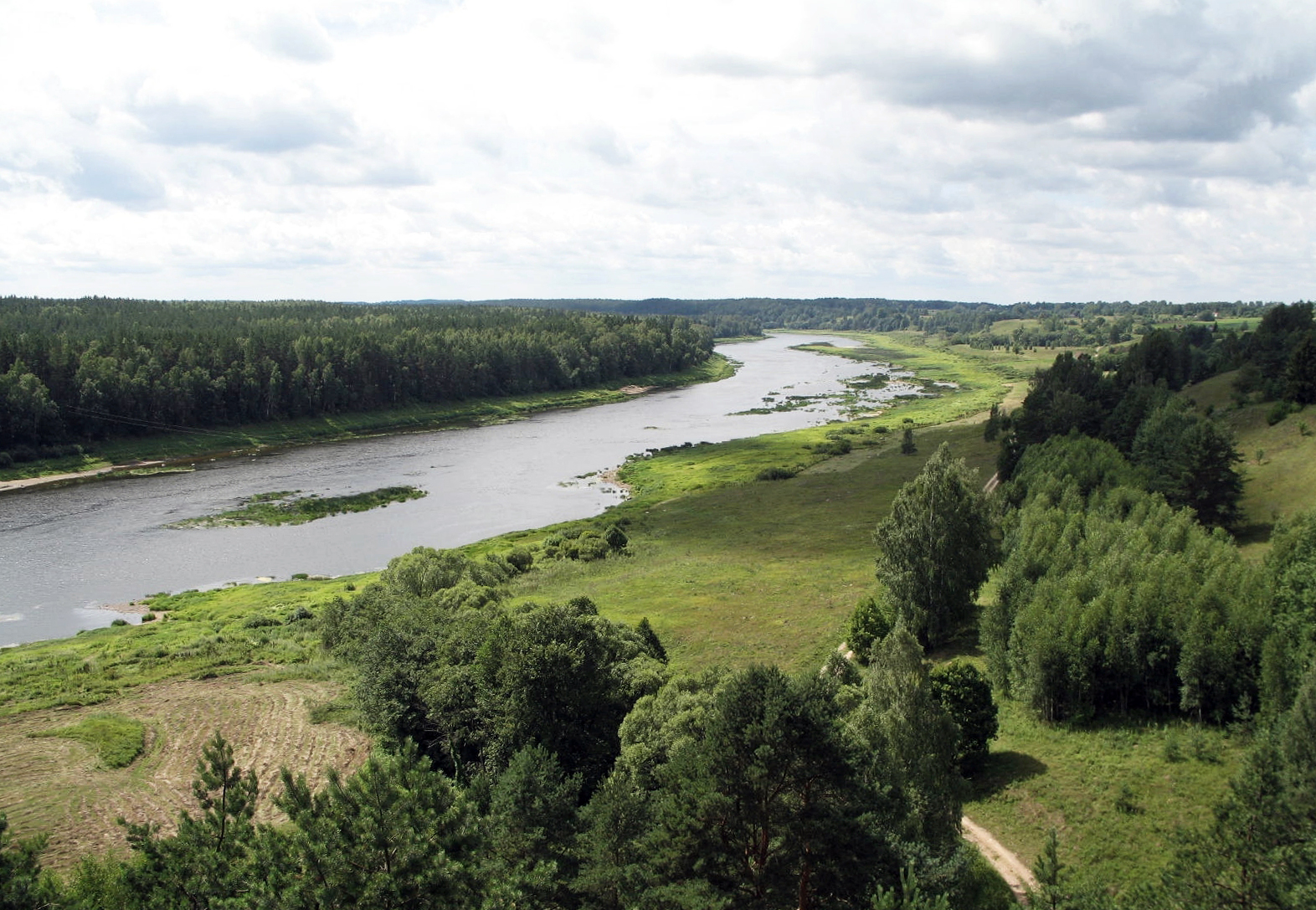
The Daugava River

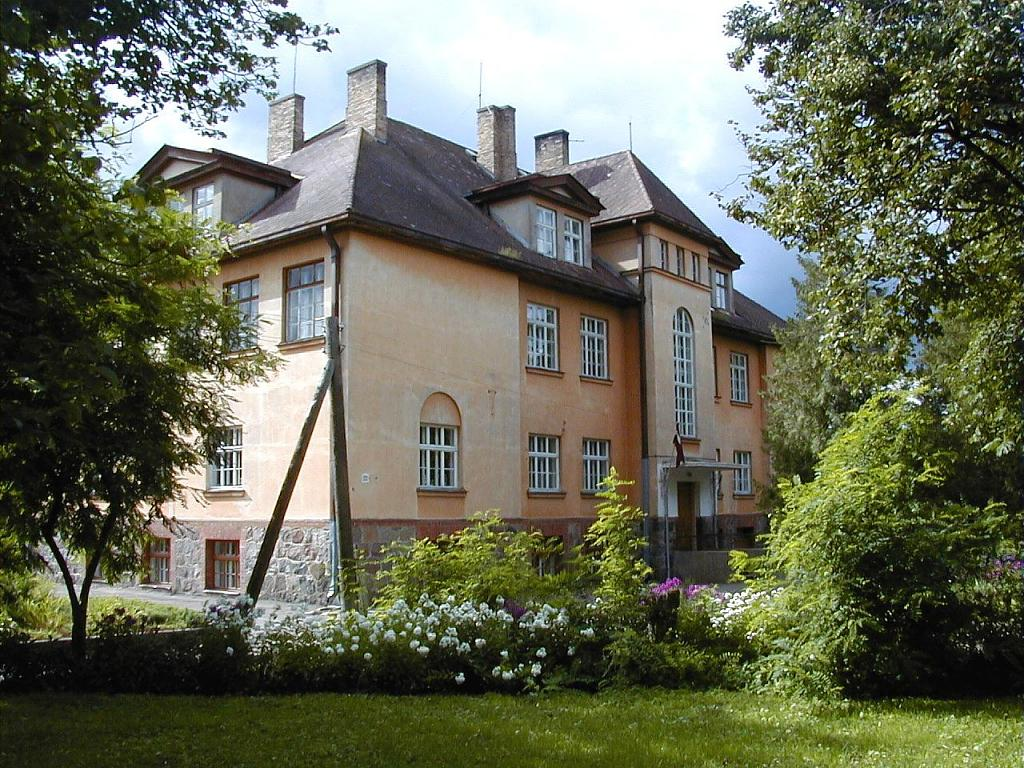
Medumi secondary school

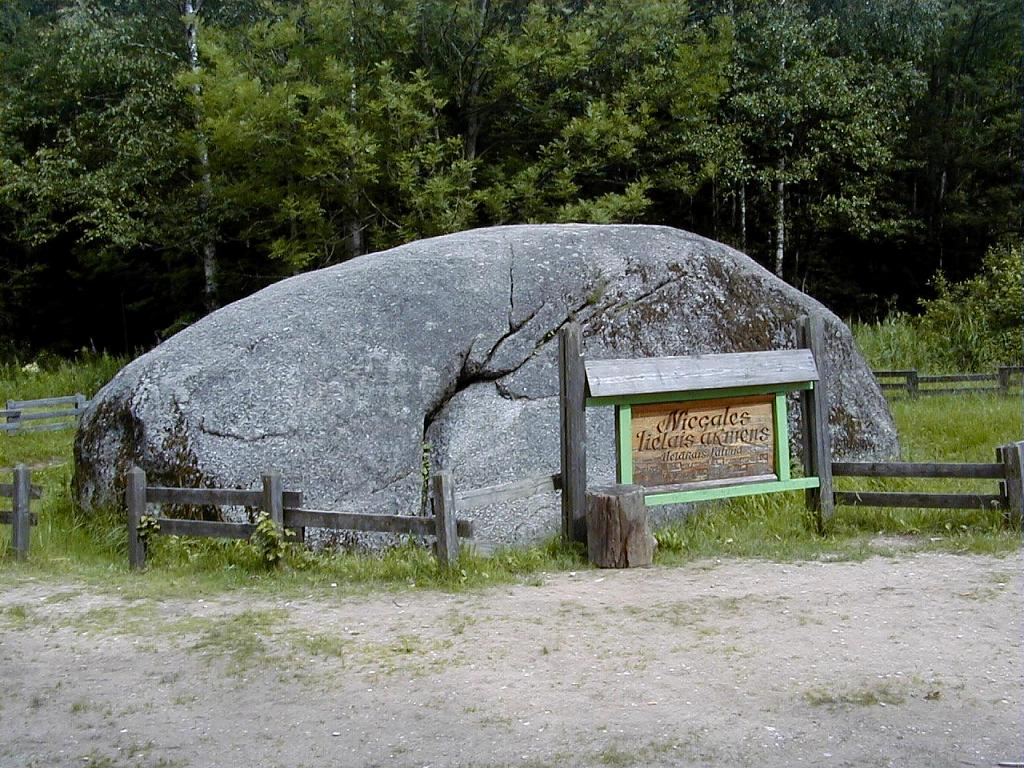
Great stone of Nīcgale

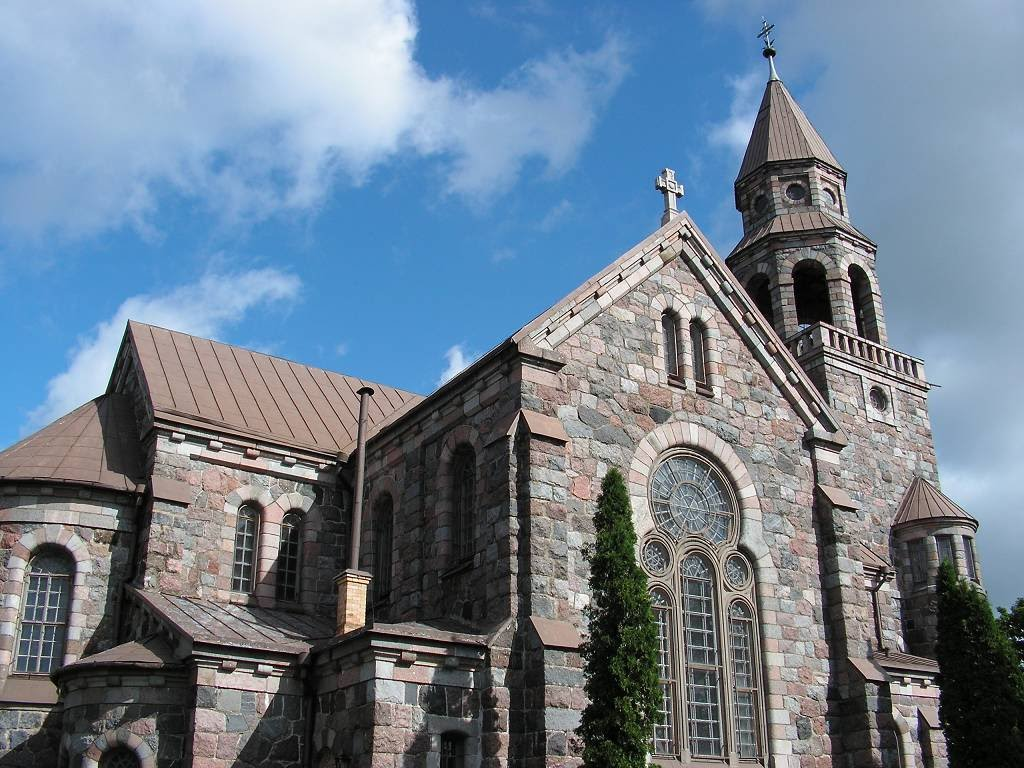
Roman Catholic church in Višķi

== See also ==
- Administrative divisions of Latvia
