= Līksna Station =

Railway station in Latvia

Līksna
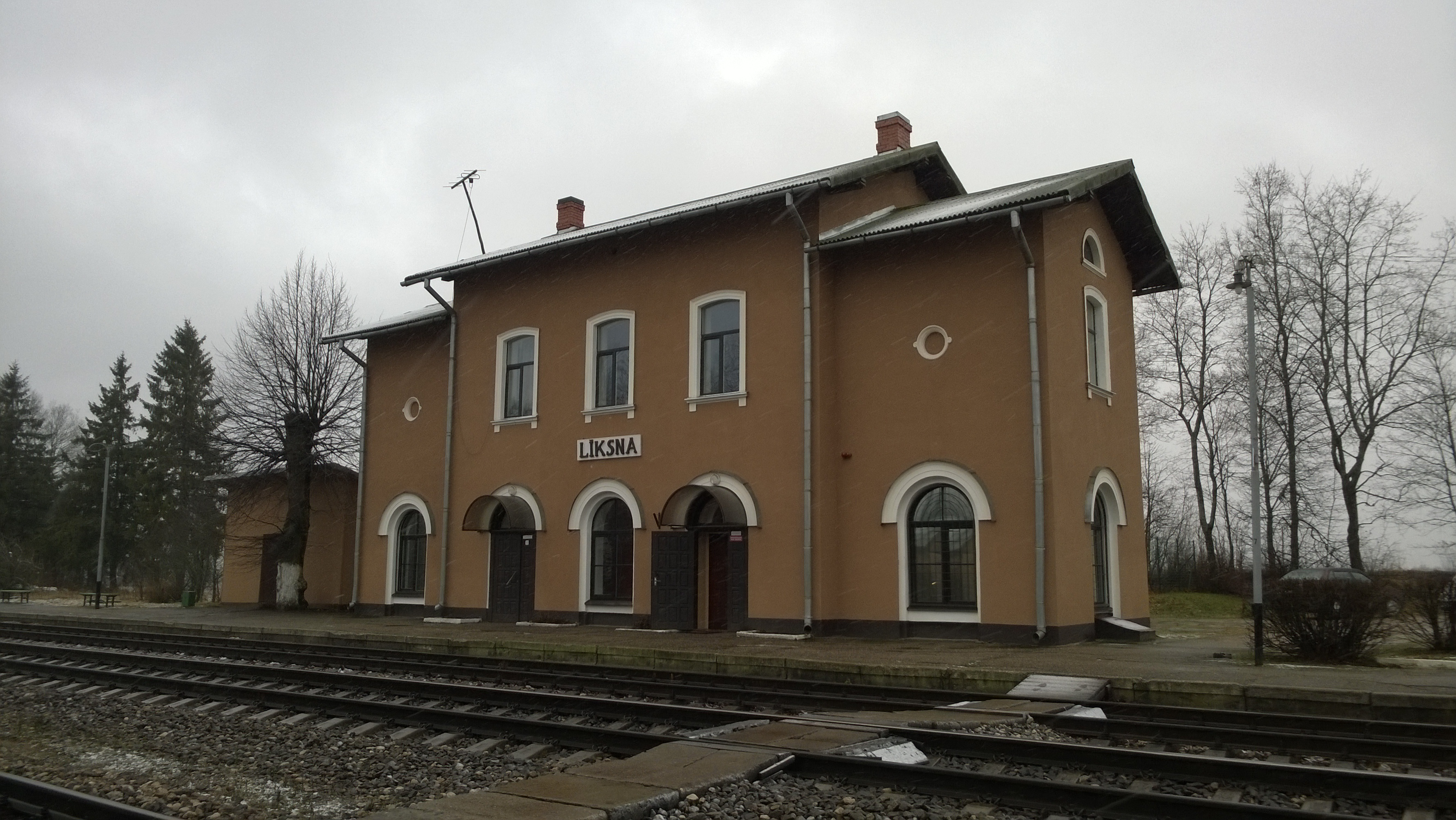

General information
- Location: Līksna, Līksna Parish, Augšdaugava Municipality
- Coordinates: 55°59′52.89″N 26°27′7.06″E

History
- Opened: 1861
- Former names: Lixna

Services
Preceding station	LDz	Following station
Vabole towards Riga	Riga–Daugavpils	Daugavpils Terminus
Location
- Location within Latvia railways

Līksna Station is a railway station serving the village of Līksna in the Latgale region of Latvia. It is located on the Riga–Daugavpils Railway.
