= Vabole Station =

Railway station in Vabole, Latvia

Vabole
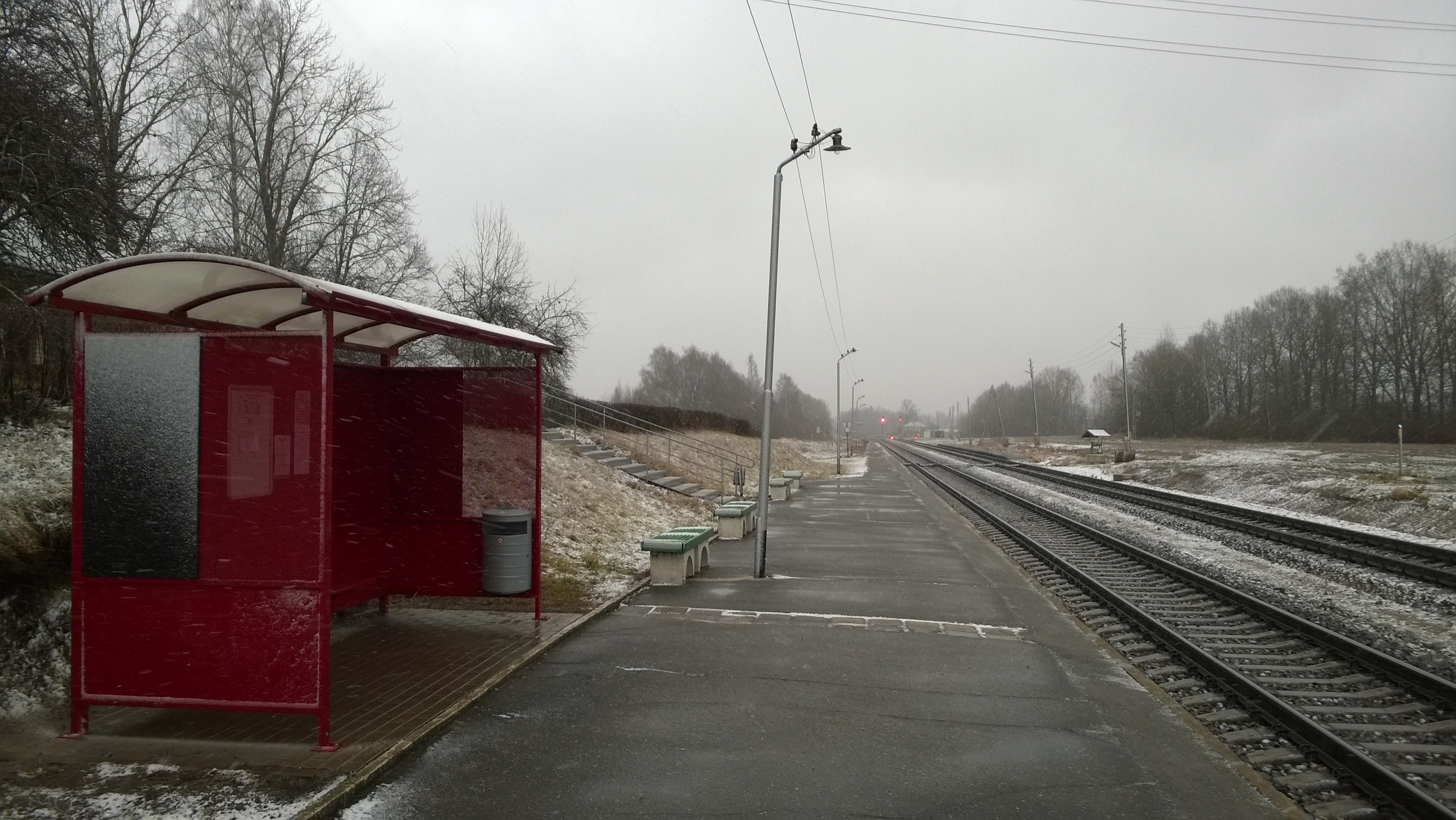

General information
- Location: Vabole, Vabole Parish, Augšdaugava Municipality
- Coordinates: 56°2′24.18″N 26°27′28.68″E

History
- Opened: 1931

Services
| Preceding station | LDz | Following station |
|---|---|---|
| Nīcgale towards Riga | Riga–Daugavpils | Līksna towards Daugavpils |
Location
- Location within Latvia railways

Vabole Station is a railway station serving the settlement of Vabole in the Latgale region of Latvia. It is located on the Riga – Daugavpils Railway.
