= Vecsaliena Manor =

Manor house in Latvia

- Vecsalienas muiža
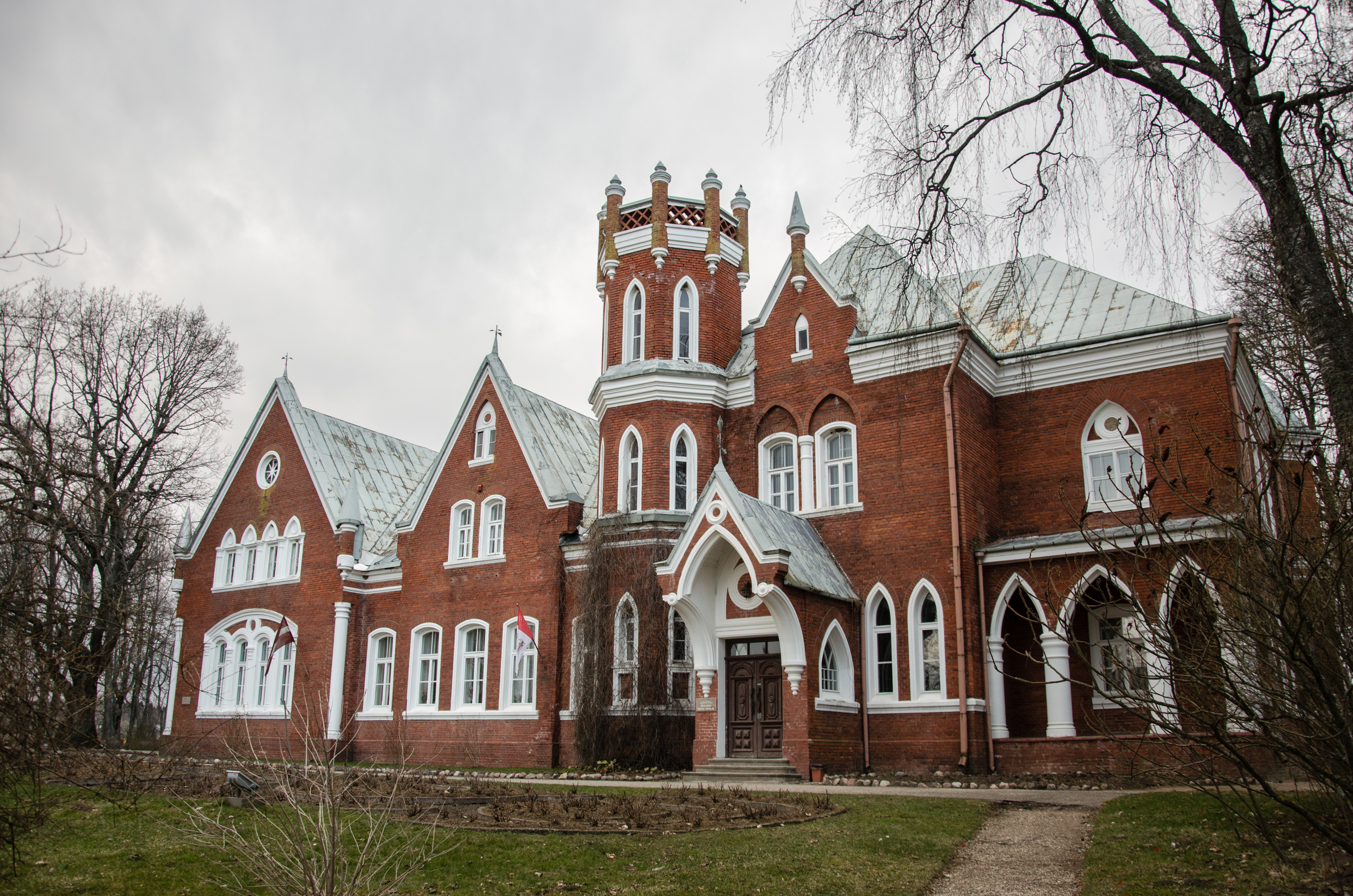

- Location within Latvia

General information
- Architectural style: English Neo-Gothic
- Location: Červonka, Vecsaliena Parish, Augšdaugava Municipality, Latvia
- Coordinates: 55°49′33.94″N 26°46′18.80″E
- Completed: 1870
- Client: von Hahn family

Vecsaliena Manor (Latvian: Vecsalienas muižas pils), also called Červonka Manor (Polish: Czerwony dwór) because of its red brick construction, is a manor house in Červonka, Vecsaliena Parish, Augšdaugava Municipality in the Selonia region of Latvia. The Neo-Gothic style structure was built in 1870.

Vecsaliena manor has survived all revolutions and wars of the 20th century intact. Until Latvian Agrarian reforms of 1920 Manor was owned by von Hahn family. After the reforms most of the manor lands was nationalized but last owner of the property baron Herbert Heinrich von Hahn kept manor building and 50 hectares of land. However he soon sold the manor building and departed for Germany. Manor building was used as a vocational school. In 1950 interiors of the building was reconstructed and as a result most of the stucco decorations and ceiling plafonds was lost. School was located in the manor building until 1970 when it was closed and building was used as an administration of the local kolkhoz and library. In 1985 building again was reconstructed. Today building is owned by the local Municipality and houses administration of the Vecsaliena parish.

== See also ==
- List of palaces and manor houses in Latvia
