= Červonka =

Village in Latvia

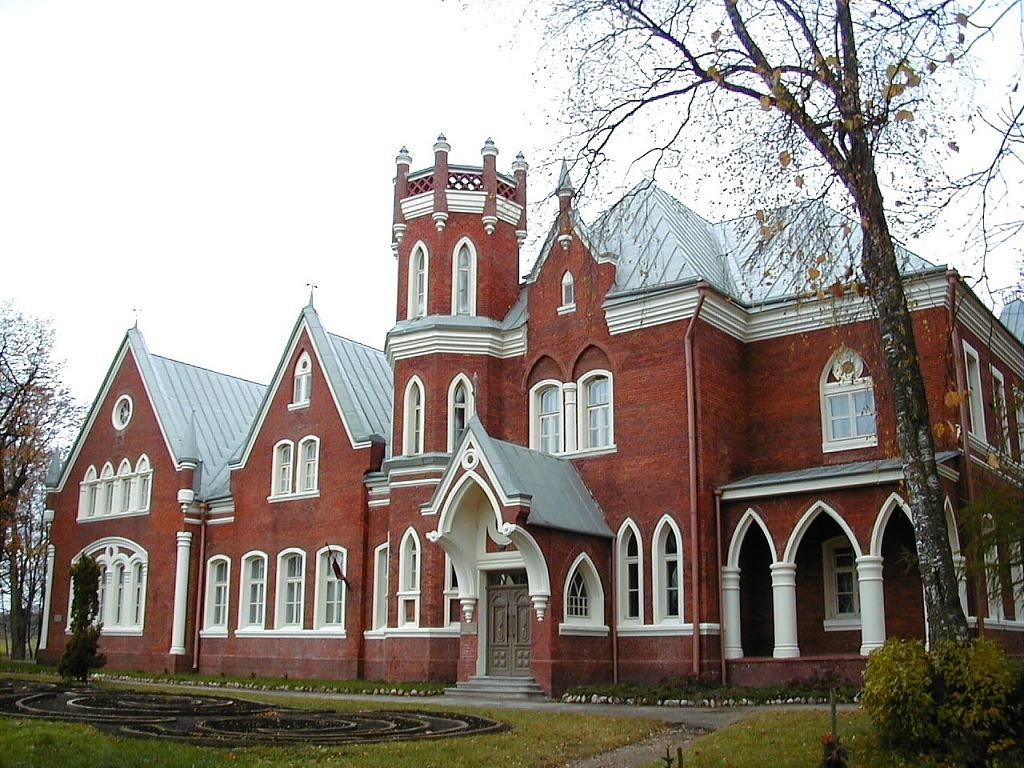
- Vecsaliena Manor in Červonka

- Location within Latvia
- Coordinates: 55°49′27.8″N 26°46′18.9″E
- Country: Latvia
- District: Augšdaugava Municipality

Population
  - Total: 219
- Time zone: UTC+2 (EET)
  - Summer (DST): UTC+3 (EEST)

Červonka, also known as Vecsaliena, is a settlement in Vecsaliena Parish, Augšdaugava Municipality in the Selonia region of Latvia. The village is known for its manor house.
