= Tabore =

Village in Latvia

- Location within Latvia
- Coordinates: 55°52′04″N 26°39′11″E
- Country: Latvia
- Municipality: Augšdaugava Municipality

Population (2015)
  - Total: 296
- Time zone: UTC+2 (EET)
  - Summer (DST): UTC+3 (EEST)

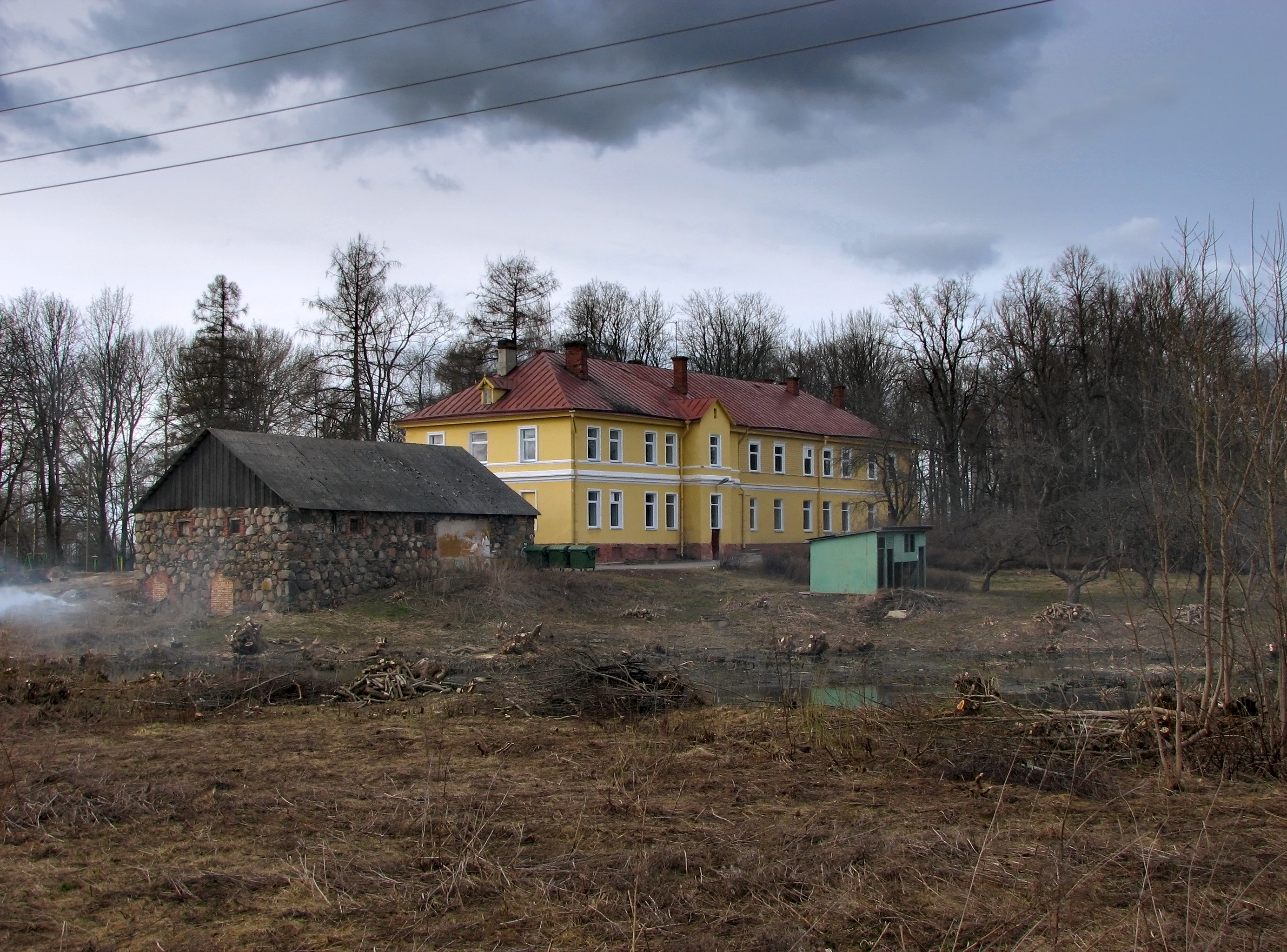
Tabore primary school

Tabore is a settlement in the Tabore Parish of Augšdaugava Municipality in the Selonia region of Latvia.
