= Maļinova =

Village in Latvia

- Medium-size village
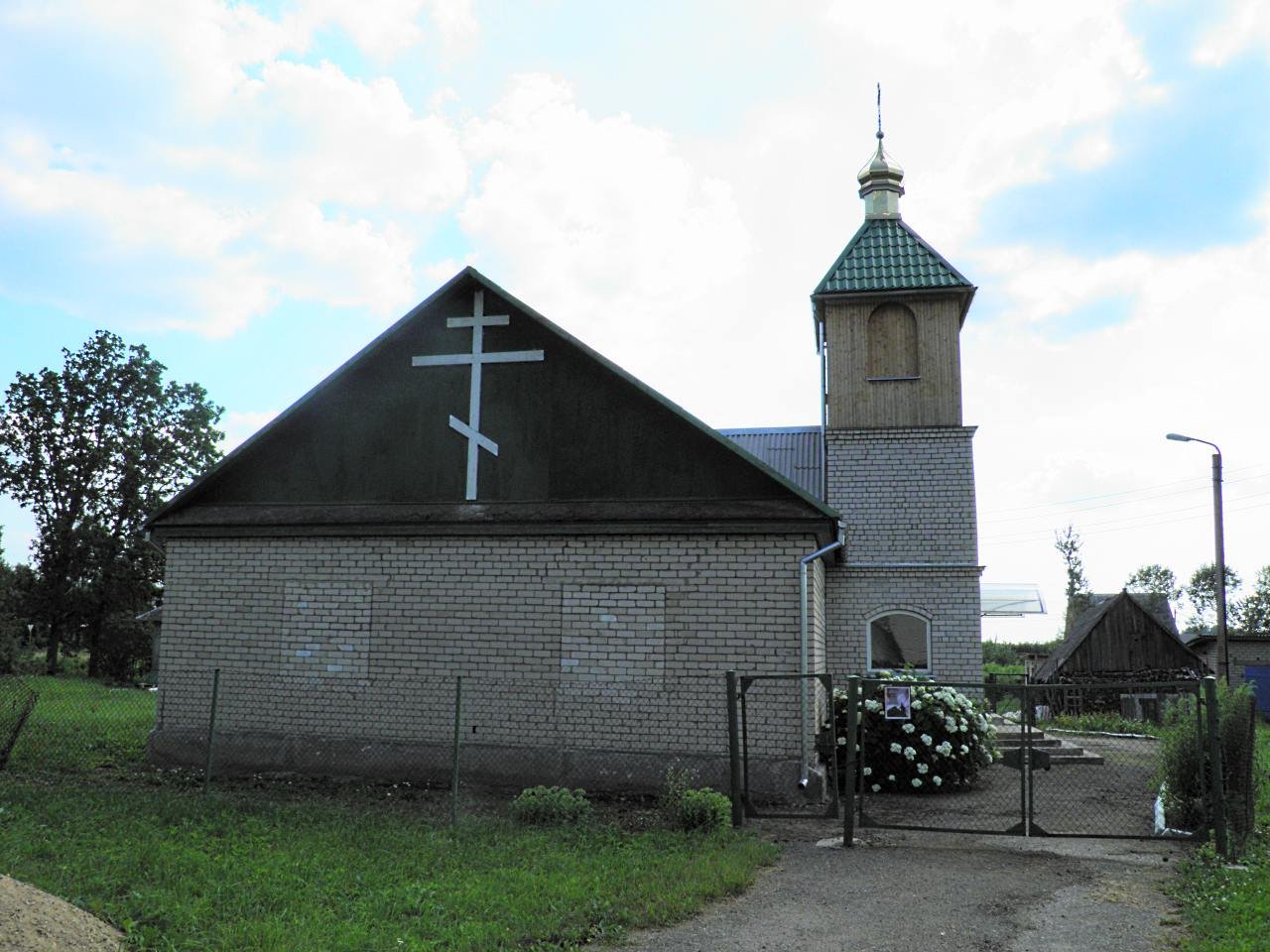
- Orthodox church in Maļinova

- Location within Latvia
- Coordinates: 55°59′24″N 26°41′27″E
- Country: Latvia
- Municipality: Augšdaugava Municipality
- Parish: Maļinova Parish
- Elevation: 125 m (410 ft)

Population (2009)
  - Total: 479
- Postal code: LV-5459

Maļinova (historically and locally known as Maļinovka) is a mid-size village in Maļinova Parish, Augšdaugava Municipality in the Latgale region of Latvia. It is a parish centre. It is located 19 km northeast of Daugavpils at the A13 national road/European route E262.

The inhabited locality grew up out of the former Malinovka village after World War II as a centre of a selsoviet and the Znamya Oktyabrya kolkhoz.

Today Maļinova is the home of the parish administration, a house of culture, library, feldsher station and the Elijah the Prophet Orthodox church, which is a rebuilt priest's house. A bell tower was built here, as a result of donations, and in 2008, three new bells were bought.

The first church in Malinova was built in 1836, but was burned down during the second world war, and in its place was built a Culture house, which was burned down in 2010. A new Orthodox church is being built on this same sit.
