= Kalupe =

Village in Latvia

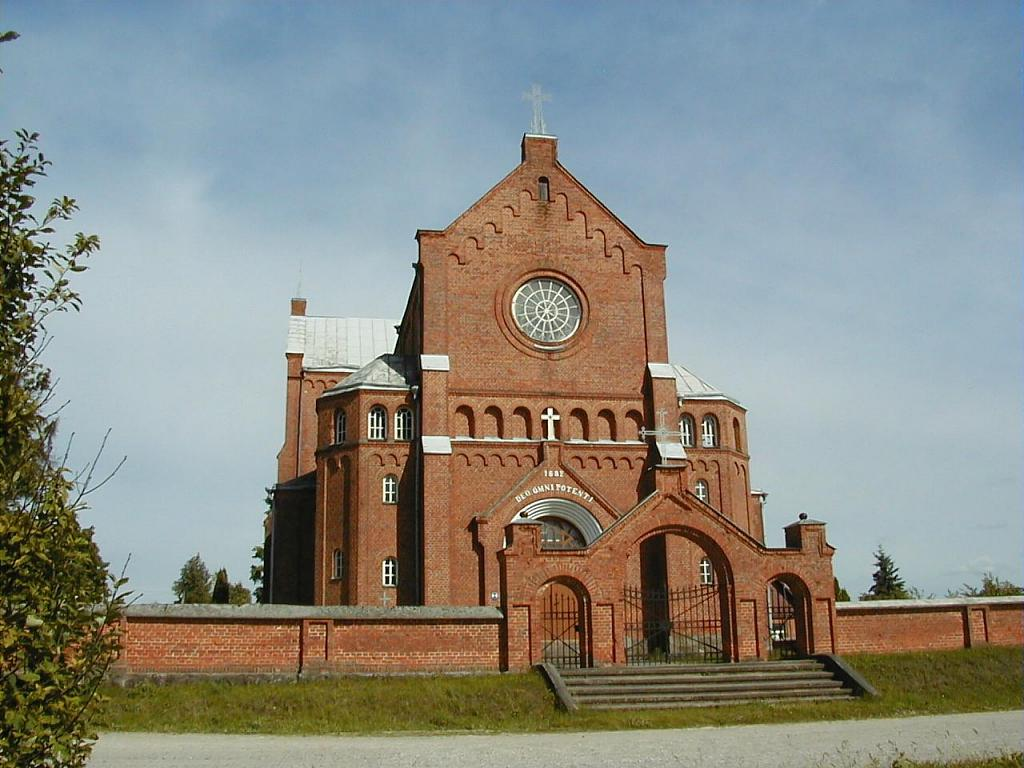
- Catholic church in Kalupe

- Location within Latvia
- Coordinates: 56°5′50″N 26°32′39″E
- Country: Latvia
- Municipality: Augšdaugava Municipality

Population (2000)
  - Total: 684
- Time zone: UTC+2 (EET)
  - Summer (DST): UTC+3 (EEST)

Kalupe is a settlement in Kalupe Parish, Augšdaugava Municipality in the Latgale region of Latvia.
