= Pilskalne Parish =

Pilskalne Parish (Pilskalnes pagasts) may refer to:

- Pilskalne Parish, Augšdaugava Municipality
- Pilskalne Parish, Aizkraukle Municipality
