= Saliena =

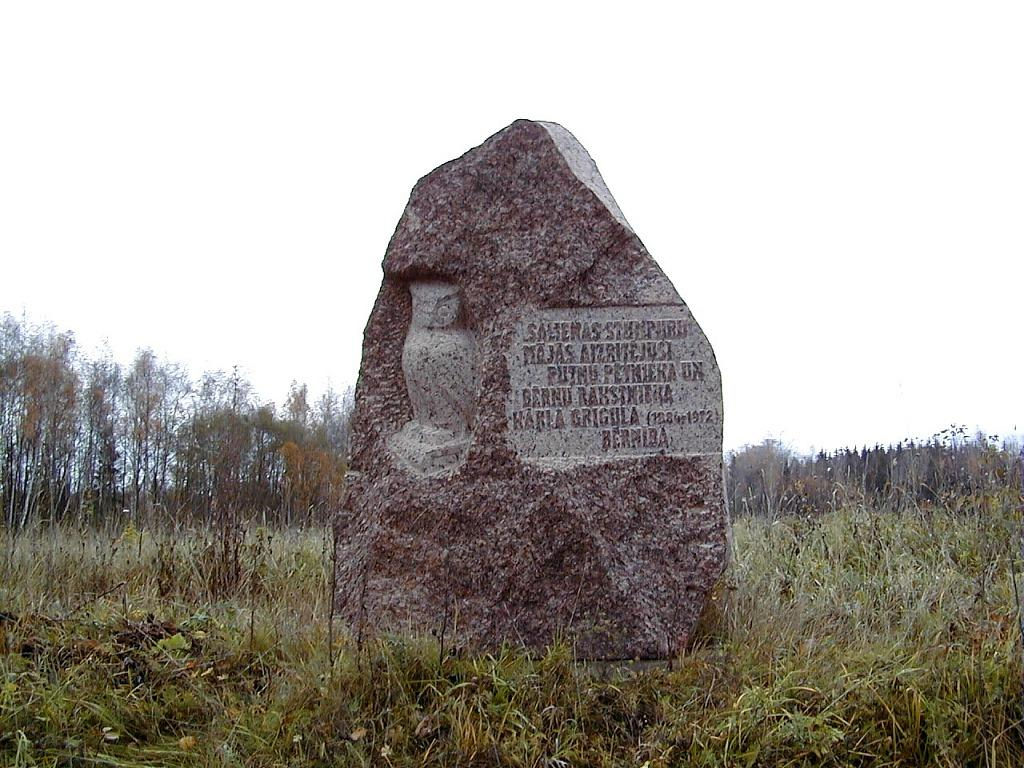
- Memorial to ornithologist and writer Kārlis Grigulis in Saliena

- Location within Latvia
- Coordinates: 55°49′30″N 26°52′45″E
- Country: Latvia
- Municipality: Augšdaugava Municipality

Population (2009)
  - Total: 302
- Time zone: UTC+2 (EET)
  - Summer (DST): UTC+3 (EEST)

Saliena (formerly Salonāja) is the biggest village and the administrative centre of Saliena Parish, Augšdaugava Municipality in the Selonia region of Latvia.
