= Ambeļi =

Village in Latvia

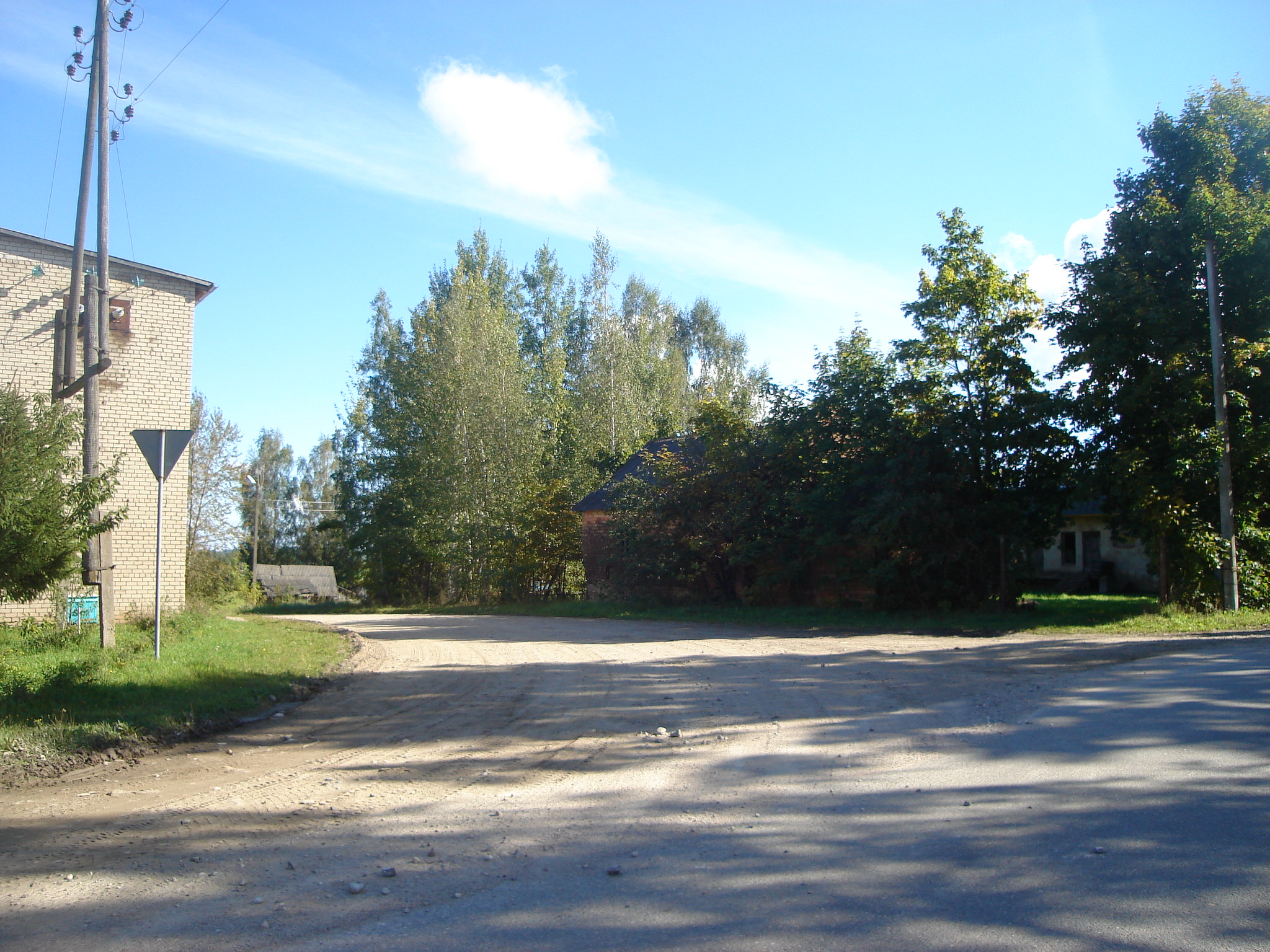

- Location within Latvia
- Coordinates: 56°2′17″N 26°50′23″E
- Country: Latvia
- Municipality: Augšdaugava Municipality
- Time zone: UTC+2 (EET)
  - Summer (DST): UTC+3 (EEST)

Ambeļi is a settlement in Ambeļi Parish, Augšdaugava Municipality in the Latgale region of Latvia. It is located in the western part of the parish, near the Dubna River flowing into Lake Višķu, 32 km from the county seat in Daugavpils and 231 km from Latvian capital Riga.
