= Medumi =

Village in Latvia

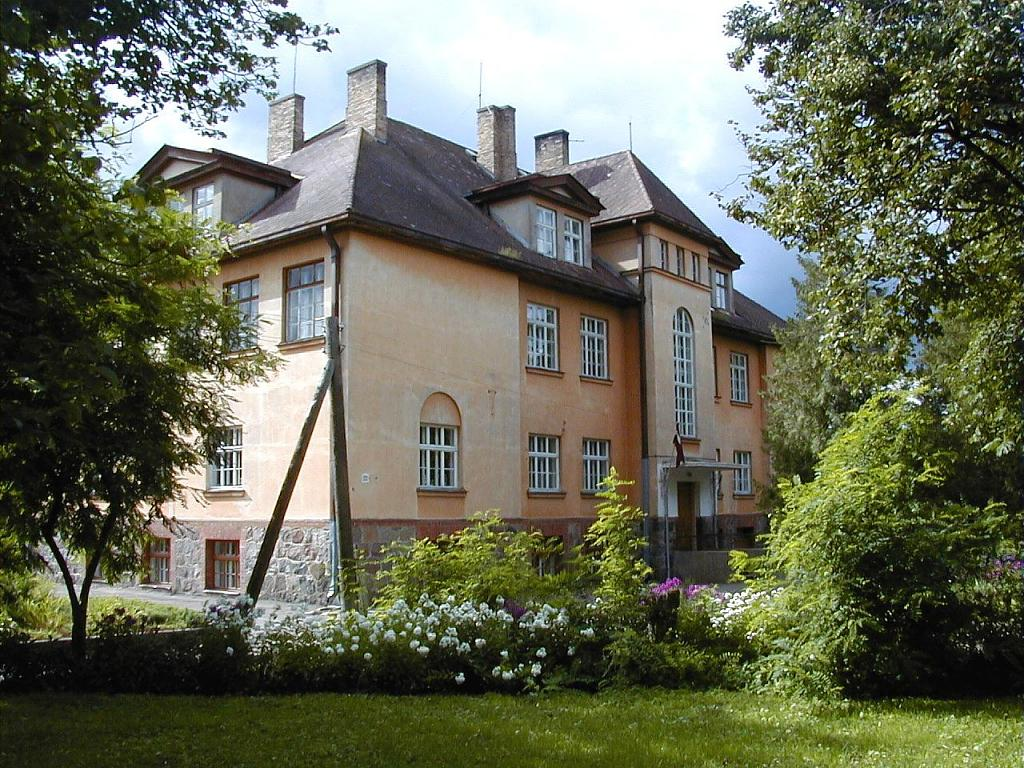
- School in Medumi

- Location within Latvia
- Coordinates: 55°47′07″N 26°21′25″E
- Country: Latvia
- Municipality: Augšdaugava Municipality

Population (2009)
  - Total: 670
- Time zone: UTC+2 (EET)
  - Summer (DST): UTC+3 (EEST)

Medumi is a settlement in Medumi Parish, Augšdaugava Municipality in the Selonia region of Latvia.
