= Demene =

Village in Latvia

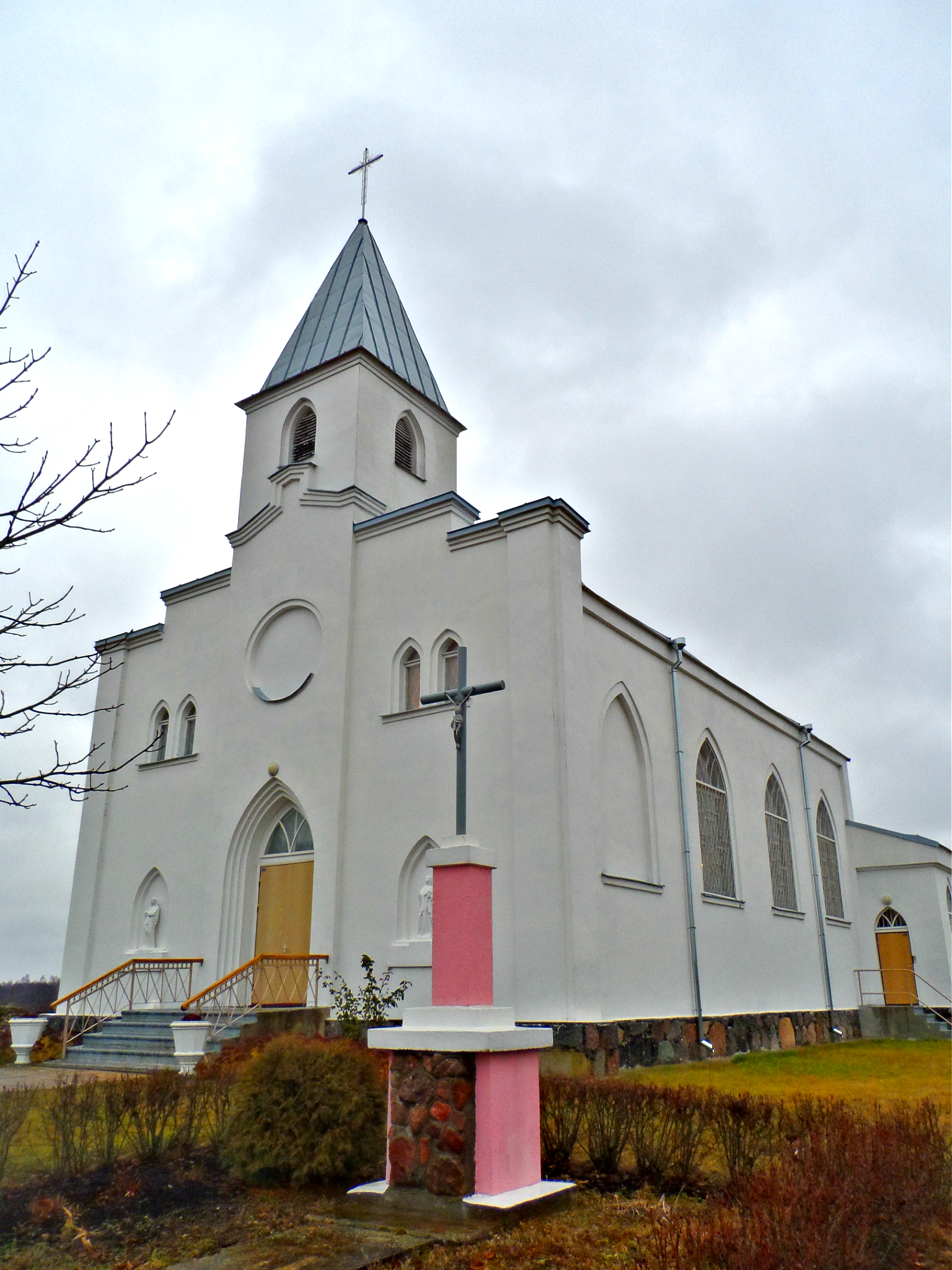
- Catholic church in Demene

- Location within Latvia
- Coordinates: 55°43′53″N 26°32′30″E
- Country: Latvia
- Municipality: Augšdaugava Municipality

Population (2015)
  - Total: 299
- Time zone: UTC+2 (EET)
  - Summer (DST): UTC+3 (EEST)

Demene (formerly:Taržeka) is a settlement in Demene Parish in Augšdaugava Municipality in the Selonia region of Latvia.
