= Vabole =

Village in Latvia

- Location within Latvia
- Coordinates: 56°1′41″N 26°27′46″E
- Country: Latvia
- municipality: Augšdaugava Municipality
- Time zone: UTC+2 (EET)
  - Summer (DST): UTC+3 (EEST)

Vabole (Latvian: Vabole; Latgalian: Vabale) is a settlement in Vabole Parish,Augšdaugava Municipality in the Latgale region of Latvia.
