= Augšzeme Protected Landscape =

Protected landscape area

- IUCN category V (protected landscape/seascape)
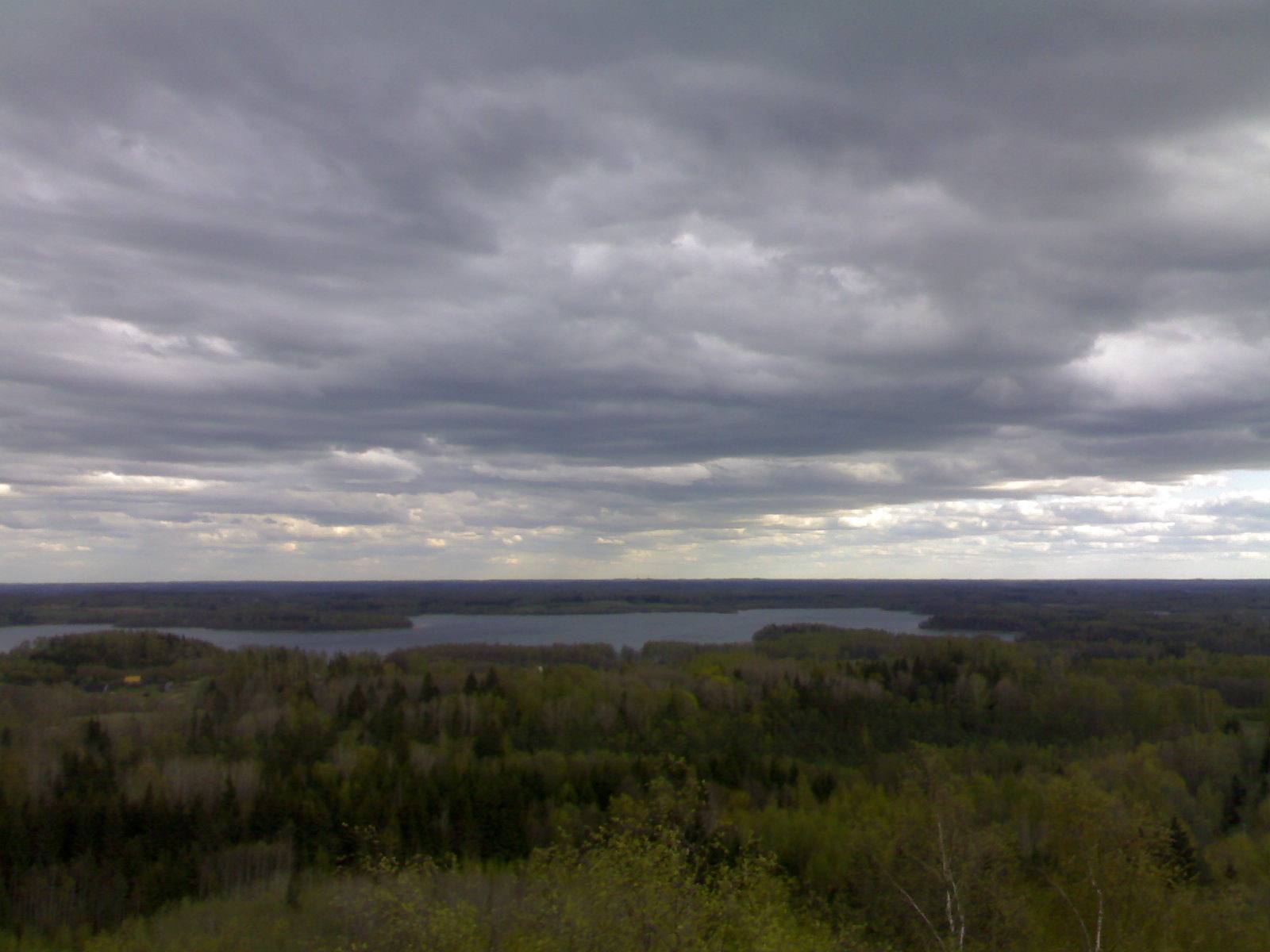
- View from Egļukalns

- Location within Latvia
- Location: Latvia, Selonia
- Coordinates: 55°48′00″N 26°20′00″E
- Area: 208.13 km^{2} (80.36 sq mi)
- Established: 1977

Augšzeme Protected Landscape is located in Augšdaugava Municipality, in the Selonia region of Latvia. Located on the left bank of the Upper Daugava, occupying the southeast of Ilūkste hill with Egļukalns and Skrudalienas hills southwest. Created in 1977 to preserve a very high landscape area, which includes Sventes and Medumu lakes with islands, as well as several small lakes around them. Sventes nature parks, Lake Bardinska, Islands of Lake Medumu, Lake Skujines and Islands of Lake Sventes reserves, as well as several other protected natural objects. Natura 2000 territory.
