= Ilūkste Municipality =

Coordinates: 55.9833°N 26.3000°E

Ilūkste Municipality Ilūkstes novads
- Municipality
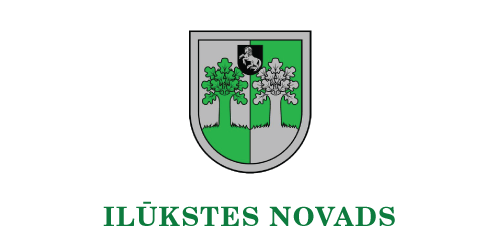
- Flag Coat of arms

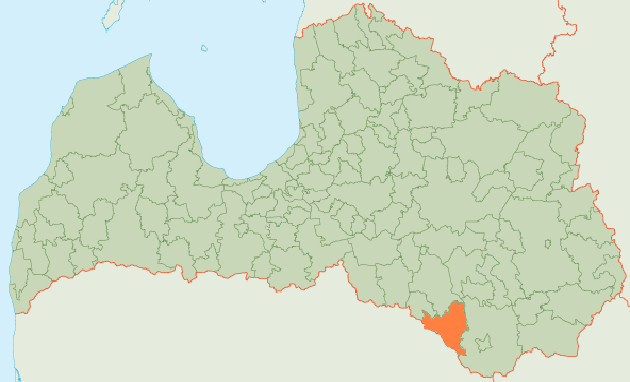
- Country: Latvia
- Formed: 2003
- Centre: Ilūkste

Government
  - Chairman: Stefans Rāzna (LZS)

Area
  - Total: 647.46 km^{2} (249.99 sq mi)
  - Land: 632.22 km^{2} (244.10 sq mi)
  - Water: 15.24 km^{2} (5.88 sq mi)

Population (2021)
  - Total: 6,374
  - Density: 10.08/km^{2} (26.11/sq mi)
- Website: www.ilukste.lv

Ilūkste Municipality (Latvian: Ilūkstes novads) was a municipality in Selonia, Latvia. The municipality was formed in 2003 by merging Pilskalne Parish, Šēdere Parish, Bebrene Parish and Ilūkste town. In 2009 it absorbed Dviete parish, Eglaine parish and Subate town with its rural area the administrative centre being Ilūkste. In 2010 the rural area of Subate was reorganised as a separate territorial entity, Prode Parish. The population in 2020 was 6,412.

On 1 July 2021, Ilūkste Municipality ceased to exist and its territory was merged into the newly formed Augšdaugava Municipality.

== Demographics ==
=== Ethnic composition ===
As of 1 January 2010 the ethnic composition of the municipality is as follows:

Ethnic group	Number	%
Latvians	5765	63,41 %
Russians	1871	20,58 %
Poles	770	8,47 %
Belarusians	251	2,76 %
Lithuanians	242	2,66 %
Others	192	2,11 %

== See also ==
- Administrative divisions of Latvia
- Kreis Illuxt
