= Bebrene Parish =

Administrative unit in Latvia

- parish of Latvia
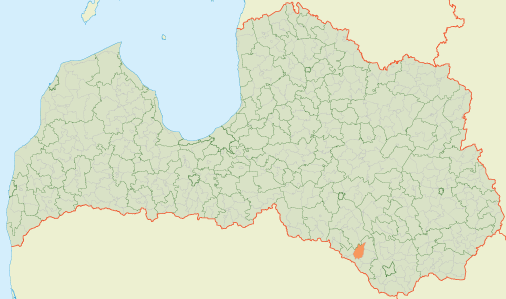
- Coordinates: 56°02′57″N 26°06′51″E
- Country: Latvia

Population (1 January 2026)
  - Total: 661

Bebrene Parish is an administrative unit of Augšdaugava Municipality in the Selonia region of Latvia (From 2009 until 2021, it was part of the former Ilūkste Municipality).
