= Līksna =

Village in Daugavpils Municipality, Latvia

Līksna Leiksna
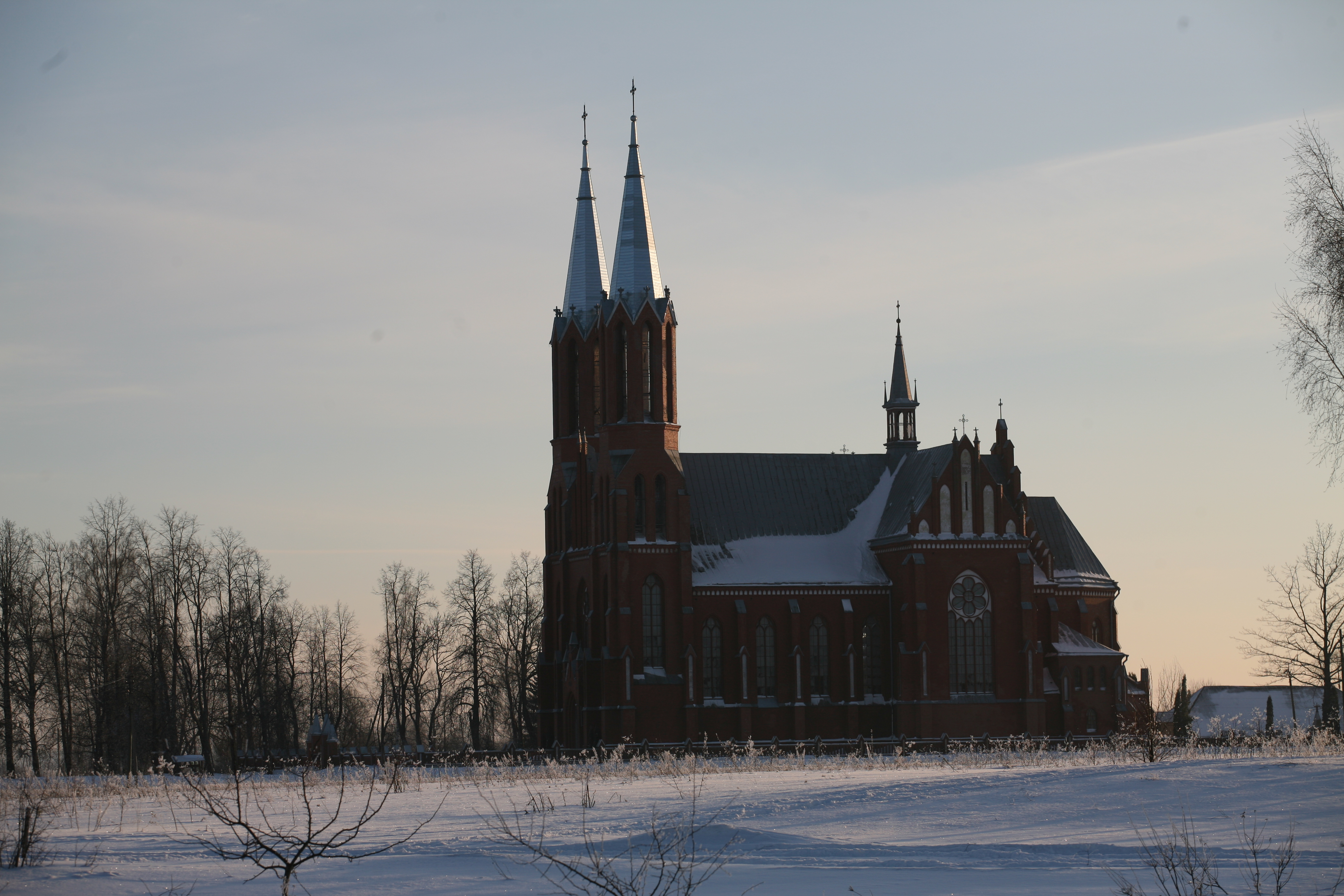
- Catholic church in Līksna

- Location within Latvia
- Coordinates: 55°59′15″N 26°24′07″E
- Country: Latvia
- Municipality: Augšdaugava Municipality
- Parish: Līksna Parish

Population (2009)
  - Total: 248
- Time zone: UTC+2 (EET)
  - Summer (DST): UTC+3 (EEST)

Līksna (Latgalian: Leiksna, German: Lixna, Polish: Liksna) is a village in Līksna Parish, Augšdaugava Municipality in the Latgale region of Latvia.

It is the birthplace of Edward Ropp, a Roman Catholic bishop in Tiraspol, Vilnius and Mogilev. It was also the place Polish-Lithuanian hero, Countess Emilia Plater, was raised in.
