= Dubna Parish =

Parish of Latvia

- parish of Latvia
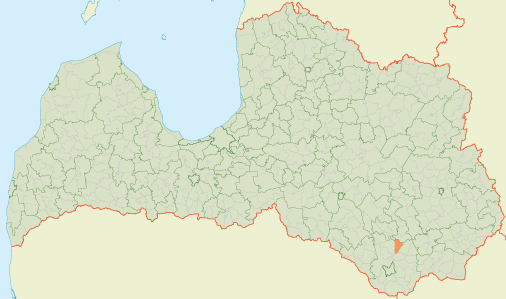
- 56°04′56″N 26°40′25″E
- Country: Latvia

Area
  - Total: 64.19 km^{2} (24.78 sq mi)
  - Land: 62.28 km^{2} (24.05 sq mi)
  - Water: 1.91 km^{2} (0.74 sq mi)

Population (1 January 2025)
  - Total: 570
  - Density: 9.2/km^{2} (24/sq mi)
- Website: www.dubna.lv

Dubna Parish (Latvian: Dubnas pagasts) is an administrative unit of Augšdaugava Municipality in the Latgale region of Latvia. Before the 2021 administrative reforms the parish was part of the Daugavpils Municipality, as well as prior to the 2009 administrative reforms it was part of the Daugavpils district.
