= Demene Parish =

Parish of Latvia

- parish of Latvia
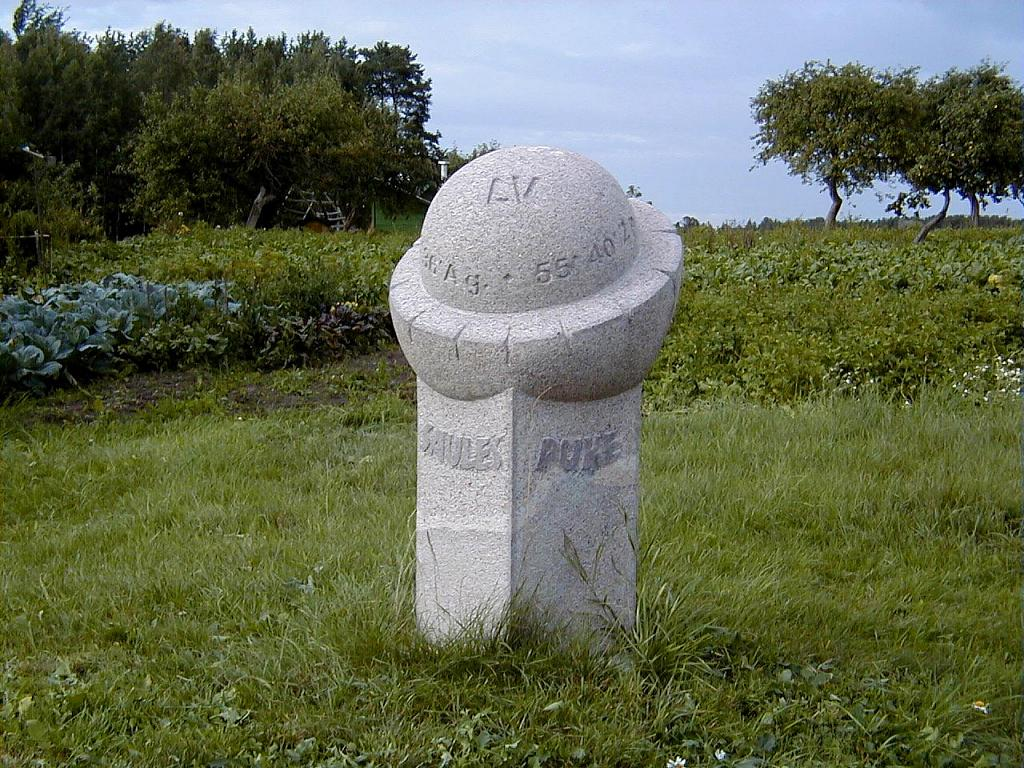

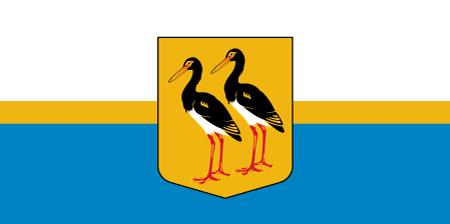
- Flag Coat of arms

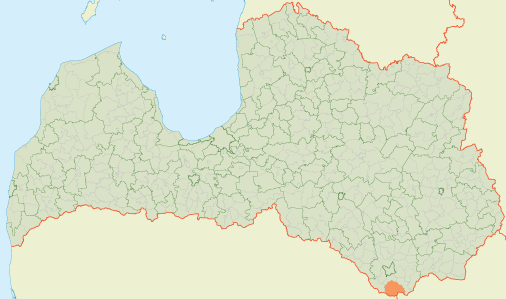
- 55°44′08″N 26°35′33″E
- Country: Latvia

Area
  - Total: 181.48 km^{2} (70.07 sq mi)
  - Land: 166.28 km^{2} (64.20 sq mi)
  - Water: 15.2 km^{2} (5.9 sq mi)

Population (1 January 2026)
  - Total: 955
  - Density: 5.74/km^{2} (14.9/sq mi)
- Website: www.demene.lv

Demene Parish (Latvian: Demenes pagasts) is an administrative unit of Augšdaugava Municipality in the Selonia region of Latvia.

== Towns, villages and settlements of Demene Parish ==
- Demene
