= Laucesa Parish =

Parish of Latvia

- parish of Latvia
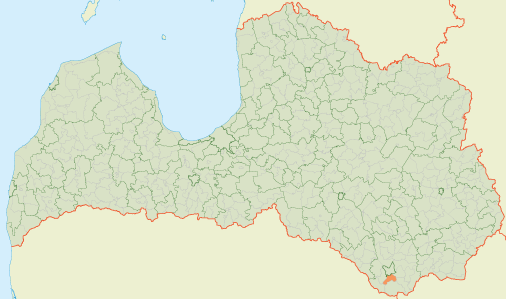
- 55°48′56″N 26°32′31″E

- Location within Latvia
- Country: Latvia

Area
  - Total: 60.68 km^{2} (23.43 sq mi)
  - Land: 59.51 km^{2} (22.98 sq mi)
  - Water: 1.17 km^{2} (0.45 sq mi)

Population (1 January 2026)
  - Total: 1,050
  - Density: 17.6/km^{2} (45.7/sq mi)
- Website: laucese.lv

Laucesa Parish (Latvian: Laucesas pagasts) is an administrative unit of Augšdaugava Municipality in the Selonia region of Latvia. The administrative centre is the village of Mirnijs.
