= Tabore Parish =

Parish of Latvia

- parish of Latvia
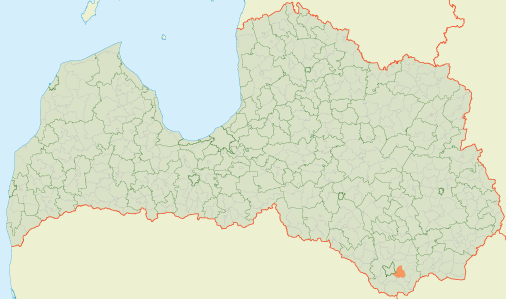
- 55°51′48″N 26°41′10″E

- Location within Latvia
- Country: Latvia

Area
  - Total: 77.11 km^{2} (29.77 sq mi)
  - Land: 73.46 km^{2} (28.36 sq mi)
  - Water: 3.65 km^{2} (1.41 sq mi)

Population (1 January 2026)
  - Total: 603
  - Density: 8.21/km^{2} (21.3/sq mi)
- Website: tabore.lv

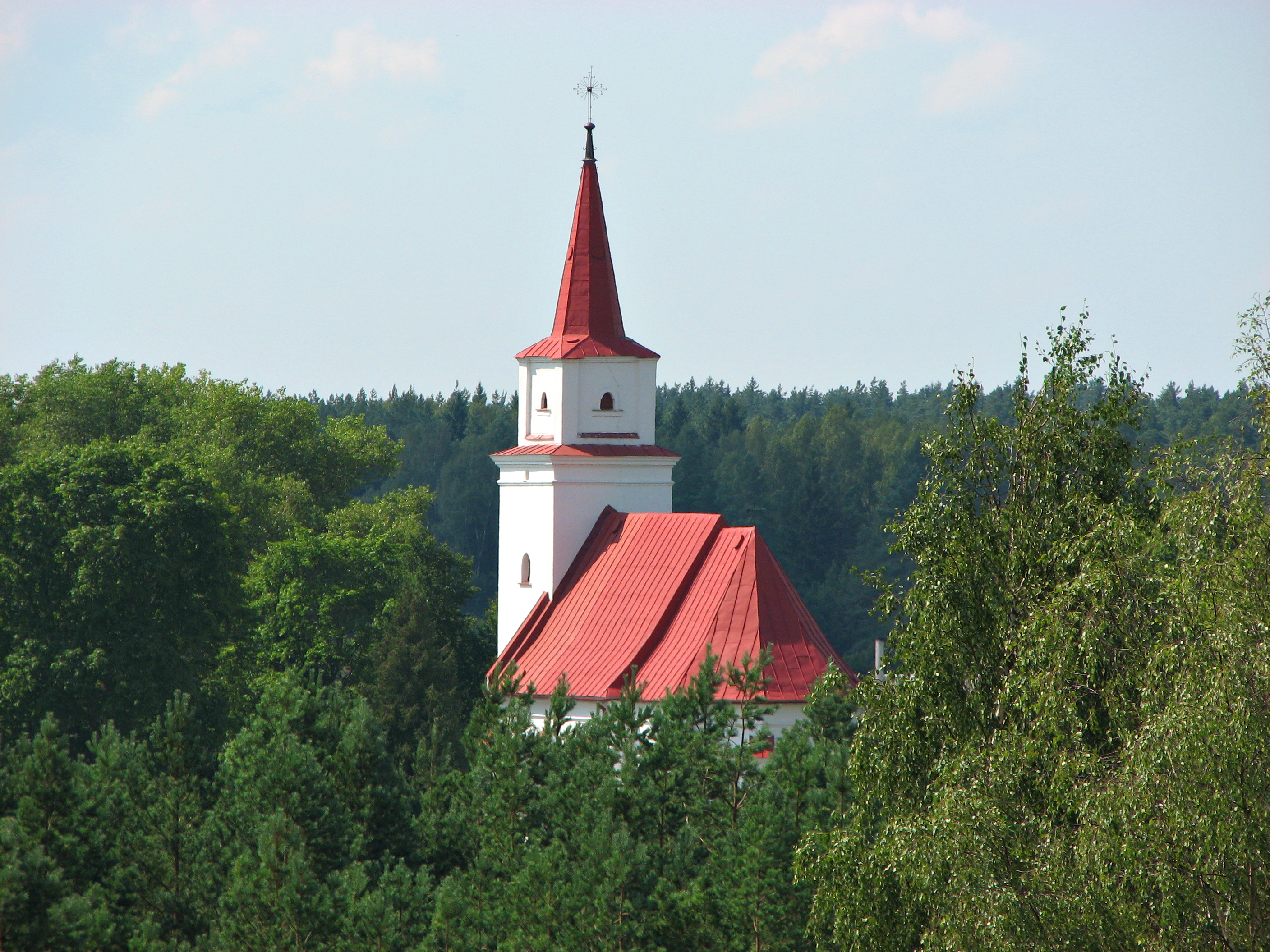
Roman Catholic (formerly Lutheran) church in Elerne, built in 1650

Tabore Parish (Latvian: Tabores pagasts) is an administrative unit of Augšdaugava Municipality in the Selonia region of Latvia.

== Towns, villages and settlements of Tabore Parish ==
- Tabore
