= Ambeļi Parish =

Parish of Latvia

- parish of Latvia
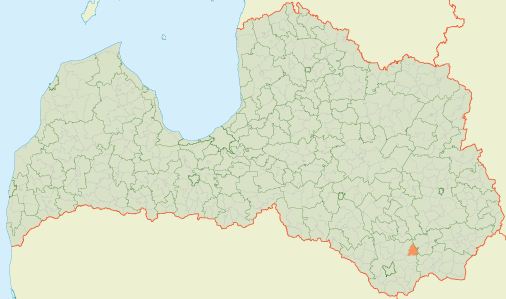
- 56°02′19″N 26°53′25″E
- Country: Latvia

Area
  - Total: 68.13 km^{2} (26.31 sq mi)
  - Land: 68.13 km^{2} (26.31 sq mi)
  - Water: 1.25 km^{2} (0.48 sq mi)

Population (1 January 2024)
  - Total: 352
  - Density: 5.2/km^{2} (13/sq mi)
- Website: www.ambeli.lv

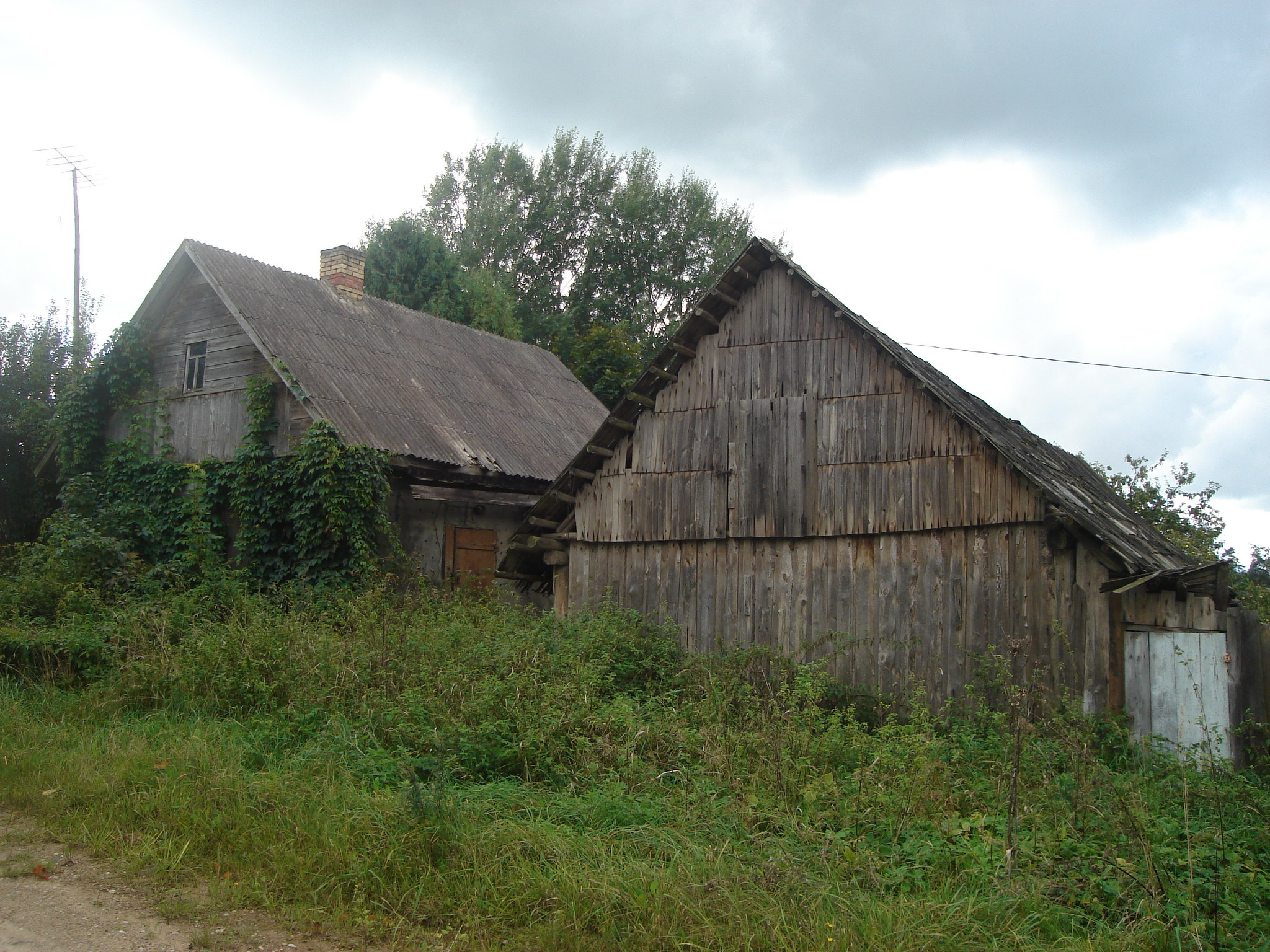
Farmstead in Ambeļi Parish

Ambeļi Parish (Latvian: Ambeļu pagasts) is an administrative territorial entity of Augšdaugava Municipality in the Latgale region of Latvia.

== Towns, villages and settlements of Ambeļi Parish ==
- Ambeļi
