= Maļinova Parish =

Parish of Latvia

- parish of Latvia
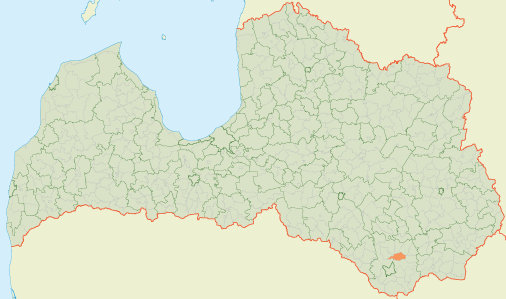
- 55°59′37″N 26°40′26″E
- Country: Latvia

Area
  - Total: 71.03 km^{2} (27.42 sq mi)
  - Land: 71.03 km^{2} (27.42 sq mi)
  - Water: 0.99 km^{2} (0.38 sq mi)

Population (1 January 2024)
  - Total: 677
  - Density: 9.5/km^{2} (25/sq mi)
- Website: malinova.lv

Maļinova Parish (Latvian: Maļinovas pagasts) is an administrative unit of Augšdaugava Municipality in the Latgale region of Latvia.

== Villages of Maļinova Parish ==
- Maļinova (parish centre)
