= Šēdere parish =

Parish of Latvia

- parish of Latvia
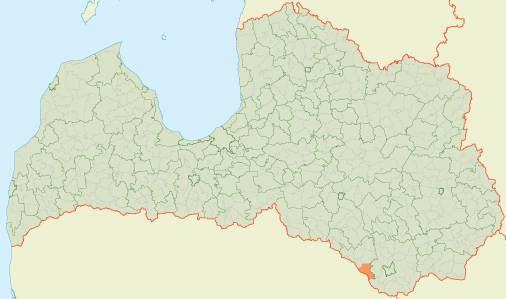
- Coordinates: 55°53′30″N 26°12′55″E
- Country: Latvia

Population (1 January 2026)
  - Total: 682

Šēdere Parish is an administrative territory of Augšdaugava Municipality in the Selonia region of Latvia. It was established under the 1920 land reform, and was previously known as Laši parish. It is situated on the southern border with Lithuania.

- Šēdere - parish administrative center

== See also ==
- Pašulienes mežs Nature Reserve
- Raudas meži Nature Reserve
