= Saliena Parish =

Parish of Latvia

- parish of Latvia, former municipality
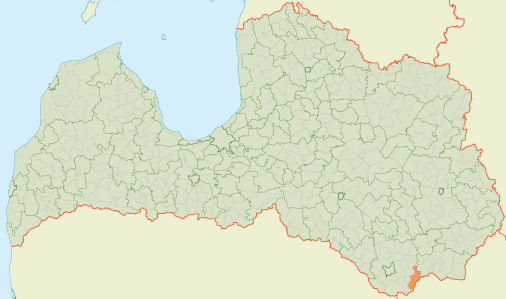
- 55°48′42″N 26°53′33″E

- Location within Latvia
- Country: Latvia, Second Polish Republic

Area
  - Total: 124.46 km^{2} (48.05 sq mi)
  - Land: 120.27 km^{2} (46.44 sq mi)
  - Water: 4.19 km^{2} (1.62 sq mi)

Population (1 January 2026)
  - Total: 453
  - Density: 3.77/km^{2} (9.76/sq mi)
- Website: saliena.lv

Saliena Parish (Latvian: Salienas pagasts) is an administrative unit of Augšdaugava Municipality in the Selonia region of Latvia.

== Towns, villages and settlements of Saliena Parish ==
- Saliena
