= Kalupe Parish =

Parish of Latvia

- parish of Latvia
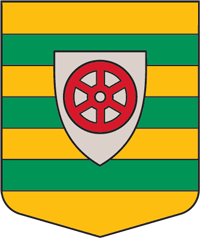
- Coat of arms

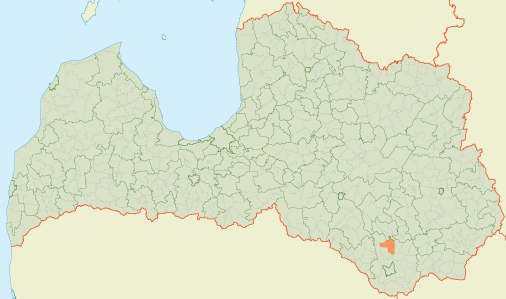
- Coordinates: 56°05′11″N 26°32′54″E
- Country: Latvia

Population (1 January 2026)
  - Total: 1,032
- Time zone: Eastern European Time
- Website: http://kalupe.lv/

Kalupe Parish (Latvian: Kalupes pagasts) is an administrative unit of Augšdaugava Municipality in the Latgale region of Latvia.

== Towns, villages and settlements of Kalupe Parish ==
- Aizupieši
- Audzeri
- Baltači
- Baltaiskrogs
- Baltmuiža
- Barovka
- Bībelišķi
- Bisteri
- Cegaļne
- Grancova
- Grustiņi
- Ignatāni
- Ivbuļi
- Kalupe
- Kapčinieki
- Ķeiši
- Krivāni
- Krutaruča
- Kuklišķi
- Kusiņi
- Lāčukrogs
- Laurišķi
- Logocki
- Mendriķi
- Miglāni
- Morkonišķi
- Peršaki
- Plonišķi
- Pramanišķi
- Pudāni
- Rasnači
- Ratnieki
- Ruksiški
- Ruži
- Salieši
- Silagols
- Sleiži
- Somukokts
- Stūrīši
- Ūda
- Vecumi
- Vizbuļi
