= Pilskalne Parish, Augšdaugava Municipality =

Parish of Latvia

Coordinates: 55°58′27.95″N 26°15′49.04″E

Pilskalne Parish Pilskalnes pagasts
- Municipality
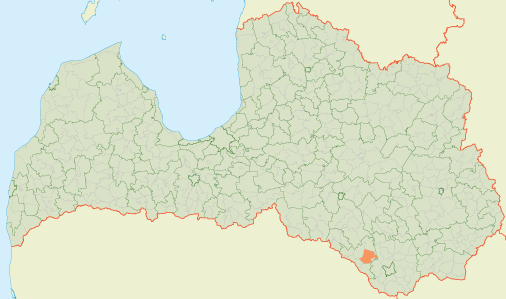
- Country: Latvia
- Centre: Pilskalne

Area
  - Total: 124.69 km^{2} (48.14 sq mi)

Population (2010)
  - Total: 1,179
  - Density: 9.455/km^{2} (24.49/sq mi)

Pilskalne Parish (Latvian: Pilskalnes pagasts) is an administrative unit of Augšdaugava Municipality in the Selonia region of Latvia (From 2009 until 2021, it was part of the former Ilūkste Municipality and before 2009 of the Daugavpils district).

== Villages ==
- Middle-sized villages (vidējciemi, 2):
  - Pilskalne (parish centre) – 223 inhabitants (2009)
  - Doļnaja – 167 inhabitants (2000)
- Small villages (mazciemi, 4):
  - Grivka
  - Kazimiriški
  - Sabaļi
  - Voitusola
- Scattered villages (skrajciemi, 19):
  - Boltaiskrūgs
  - Dronkusola
  - Gekeļi
  - Jaunlaši
  - Kalniški
  - Kalvāni
  - Koņecpole
  - Kreposte
  - Kūliņi
  - Lajiški
  - Liellazdas
  - Ludvigova
  - Padomnieki
  - Pristaņa
  - Pupiņi
  - Timšāni
  - Vigodka
  - Vilcāni
  - Zamečka

== Demographics ==
According to the 2000 census, out of 1,305 inhabitants of the parish 954 (73,1%) were ethnic Latvians, 127 (9,7%) were Russians and 127 (9,7%) were Poles.
