= Biķernieki Parish =

Parish of Latvia

- parish of Latvia
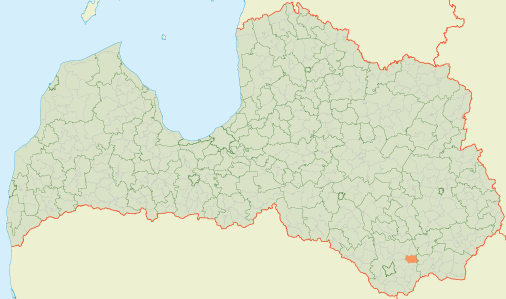
- 55°58′16″N 26°51′51″E
- Country: Latvia

Area
  - Total: 69.03 km^{2} (26.65 sq mi)
  - Land: 68.09 km^{2} (26.29 sq mi)
  - Water: 0.94 km^{2} (0.36 sq mi)

Population (1 January 2024)
  - Total: 379
  - Density: 5.5/km^{2} (14/sq mi)
- Website: www.bikerniekupag.lv

Biķernieki Parish (Latvian: Biķernieku pagasts) is an administrative unit of Augšdaugava Municipality in the Latgale region of Latvia.

== Towns, villages and settlements of Biķernieki Parish ==
- Biķernieki
