= Līksna Parish =

Parish of Latvia

- parish of Latvia
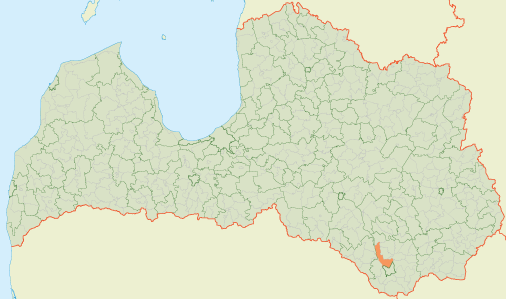
- 55°59′37″N 26°27′06″E

- Location within Latvia
- Country: Latvia

Area
  - Total: 138.28 km^{2} (53.39 sq mi)
  - Land: 132.55 km^{2} (51.18 sq mi)
  - Water: 5.73 km^{2} (2.21 sq mi)

Population (1 January 2026)
  - Total: 920
  - Density: 6.9/km^{2} (18/sq mi)
- Website: liksna.lv

Līksna Parish (Latvian: Līksnas pagasts, Latgalian: Leiksnys pogosts) is an administrative unit of Augšdaugava Municipality in the Latgale region of Latvia.

Before the Latvian administrative reform of 2021, it had been a part of Daugavpils Municipality, Daugavpils district, Daugavpils apriņķis etc.

== Towns, villages and settlements of Līksna Parish ==
- Līksna (parish center)
- Augšpole
- Aužguļāni
- Baraviki
- Gančevski
- Jaunušāni
- Jukši
- Kalniški
- Kokiniški
- Ķirupe
- Latgale
- Ļubaste
- Mīsteļi
- Munciški
- Priežu sils
- Ribaki
- Rimši
- Sterikāni
- Tilti
- Vaikuļāni
- Vērdiņi
- Zastenki-Ribaki
