= Medumi Parish =

Parish of Latvia

- parish of Latvia
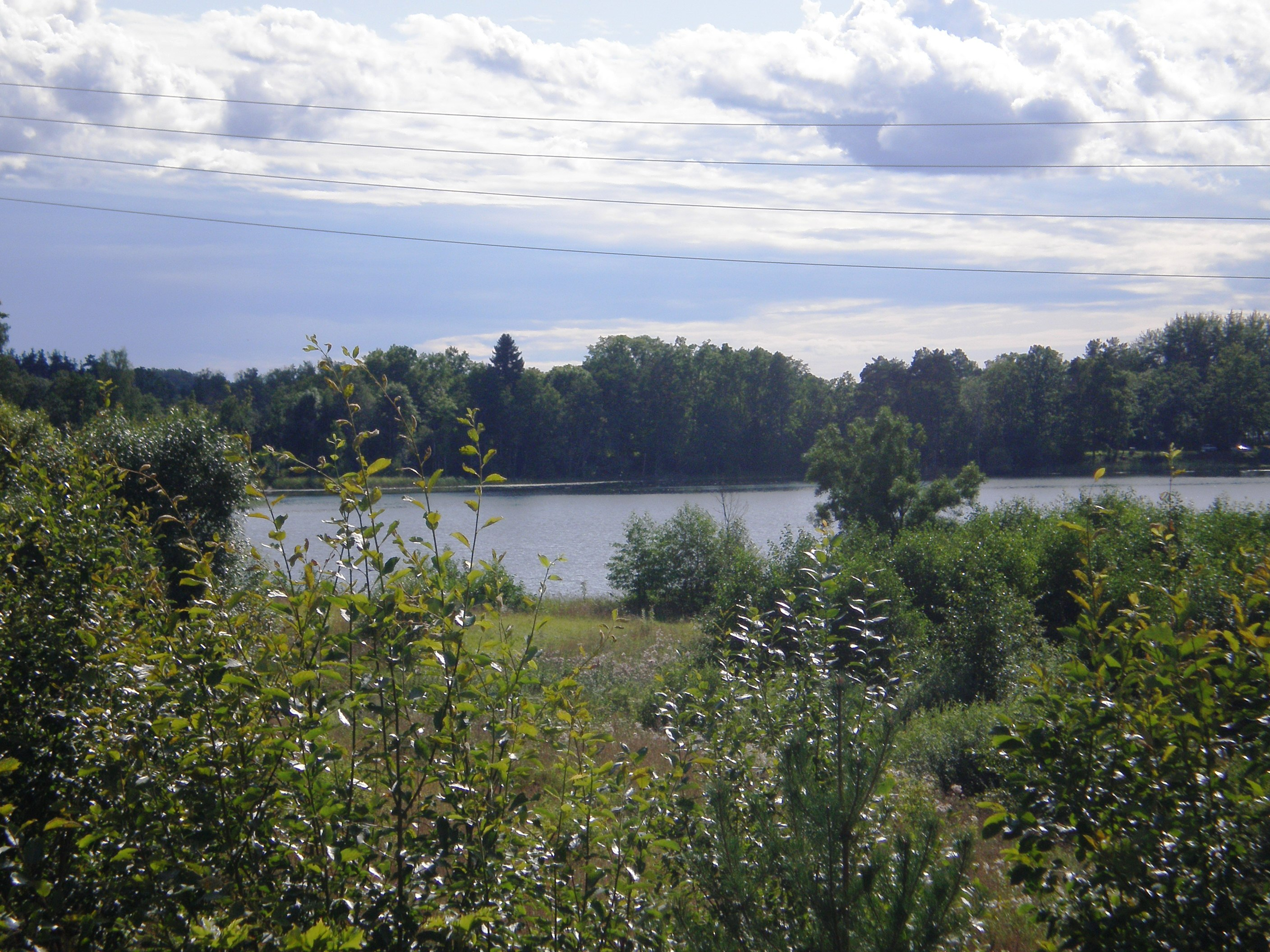

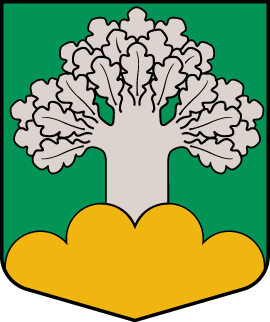
- Coat of arms

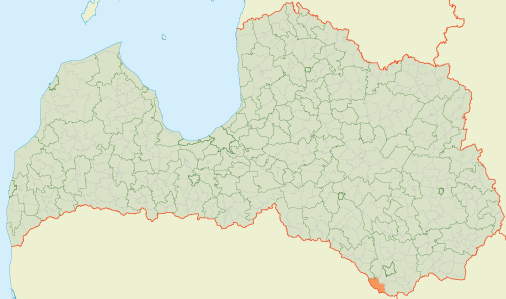
- 55°46′16″N 26°21′29″E

- Location within Latvia
- Country: Latvia

Area
  - Total: 116.55 km^{2} (45.00 sq mi)
  - Land: 108.46 km^{2} (41.88 sq mi)
  - Water: 8.09 km^{2} (3.12 sq mi)

Population (1 January 2026)
  - Total: 618
  - Density: 5.70/km^{2} (14.8/sq mi)
- Website: medumi.lv

Medumi Parish (Latvian: Medumu pagasts) is an administrative unit of Augšdaugava Municipality in the Selonia region of Latvia.

== Towns, villages and settlements of Medumi Parish ==
- Medumi
