= Vabole Parish =

Parish of Latvia

- parish of Latvia
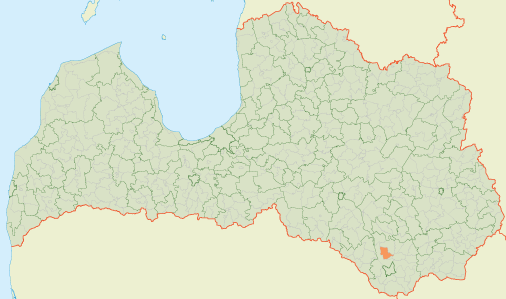
- 56°01′40″N 26°29′26″E
- Country: Latvia

Area
  - Total: 77.64 km^{2} (29.98 sq mi)
  - Land: 75.91 km^{2} (29.31 sq mi)
  - Water: 1.73 km^{2} (0.67 sq mi)

Population (1 January 2025)
  - Total: 566
  - Density: 7.46/km^{2} (19.3/sq mi)
- Website: vabolespag.lv

Vabole Parish (Latvian: Vaboles pagasts; Latgalian: Vabalis pogosts) is an administrative unit of Augšdaugava Municipality in the Latgale region of Latvia.

== Towns, villages and settlements of Vabole Parish ==
- Vabole
