= Vecsaliena Parish =

Parish of Latvia

- parish of Latvia
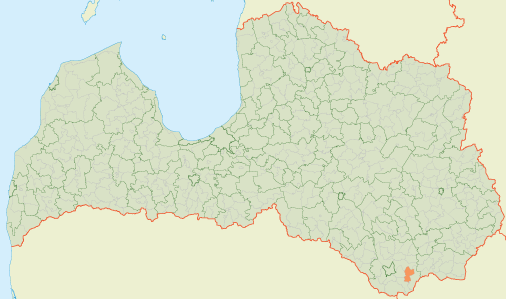
- 55°50′56″N 26°48′43″E
- Country: Latvia

Area
  - Total: 82.04 km^{2} (31.68 sq mi)
  - Land: 80.24 km^{2} (30.98 sq mi)
  - Water: 1.8 km^{2} (0.69 sq mi)

Population (1 January 2025)
  - Total: 469
  - Density: 5.84/km^{2} (15.1/sq mi)
- Website: vecsaliena.lv

Vecsaliena Parish (Latvian: Vecsalienas pagasts) is an administrative unit of Augšdaugava Municipality in the Selonia region of Latvia.

== Towns, villages and settlements of Vecsaliena Parish ==
- Červonka
