= Augšdaugava Municipality =

Municipality of Latvia

Augšdaugava Municipality Augšdaugavas novads
- Municipality
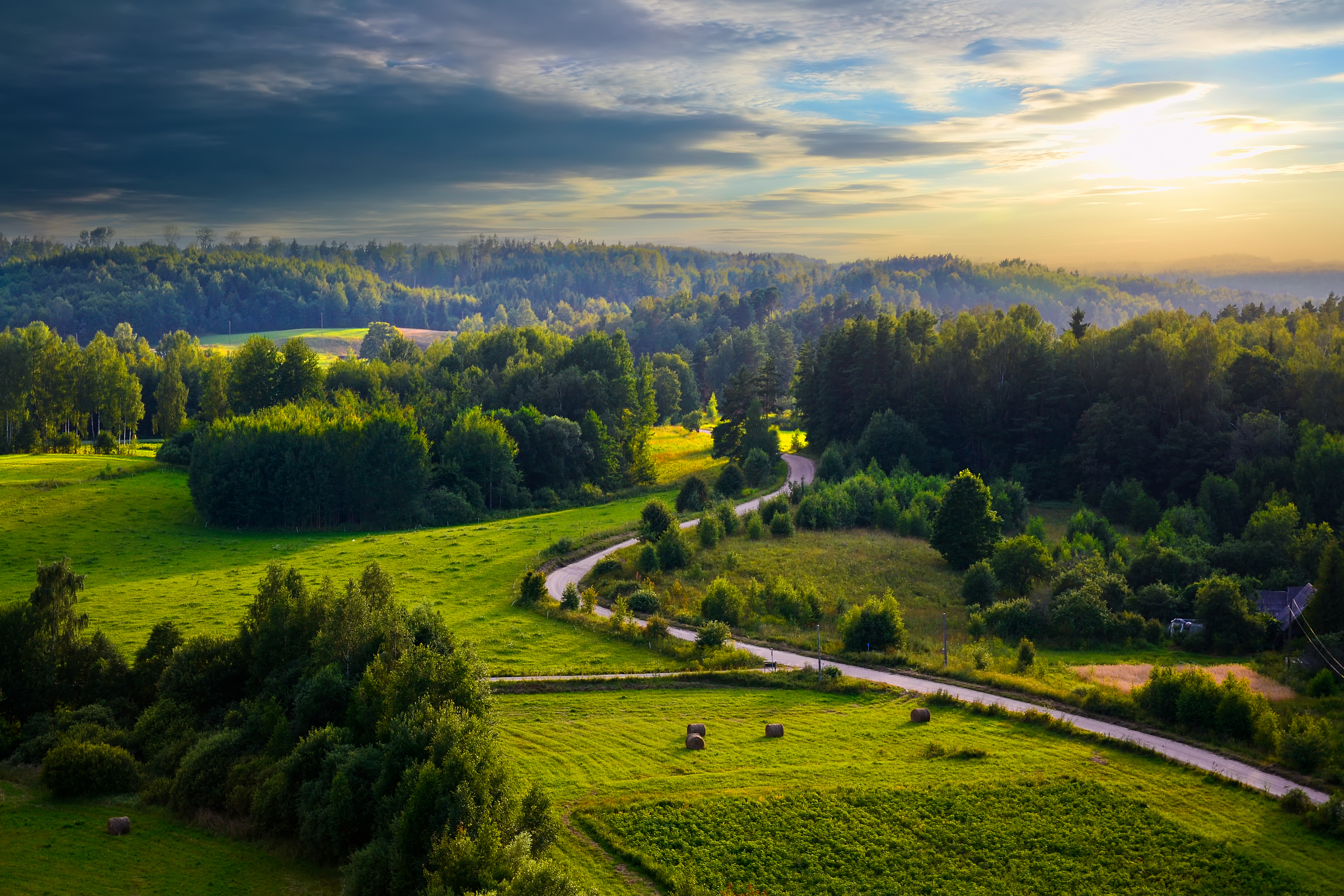
- Augšzeme landscape in Svente Parish

- Flag Coat of arms

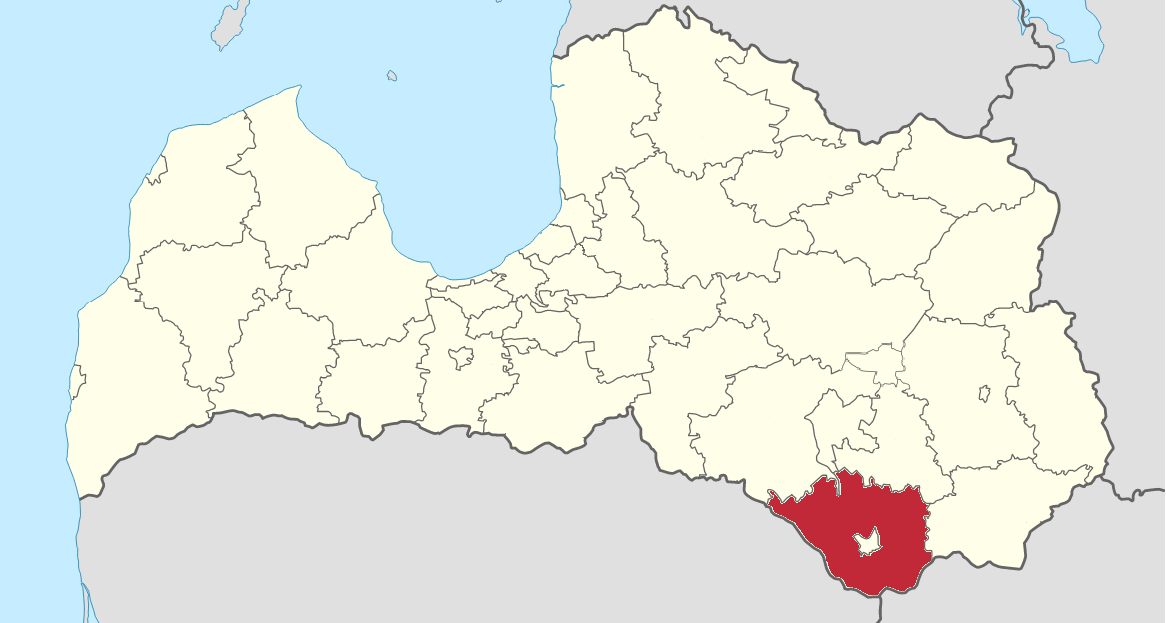
- Location of Augšdaugava Municipality in Latvia

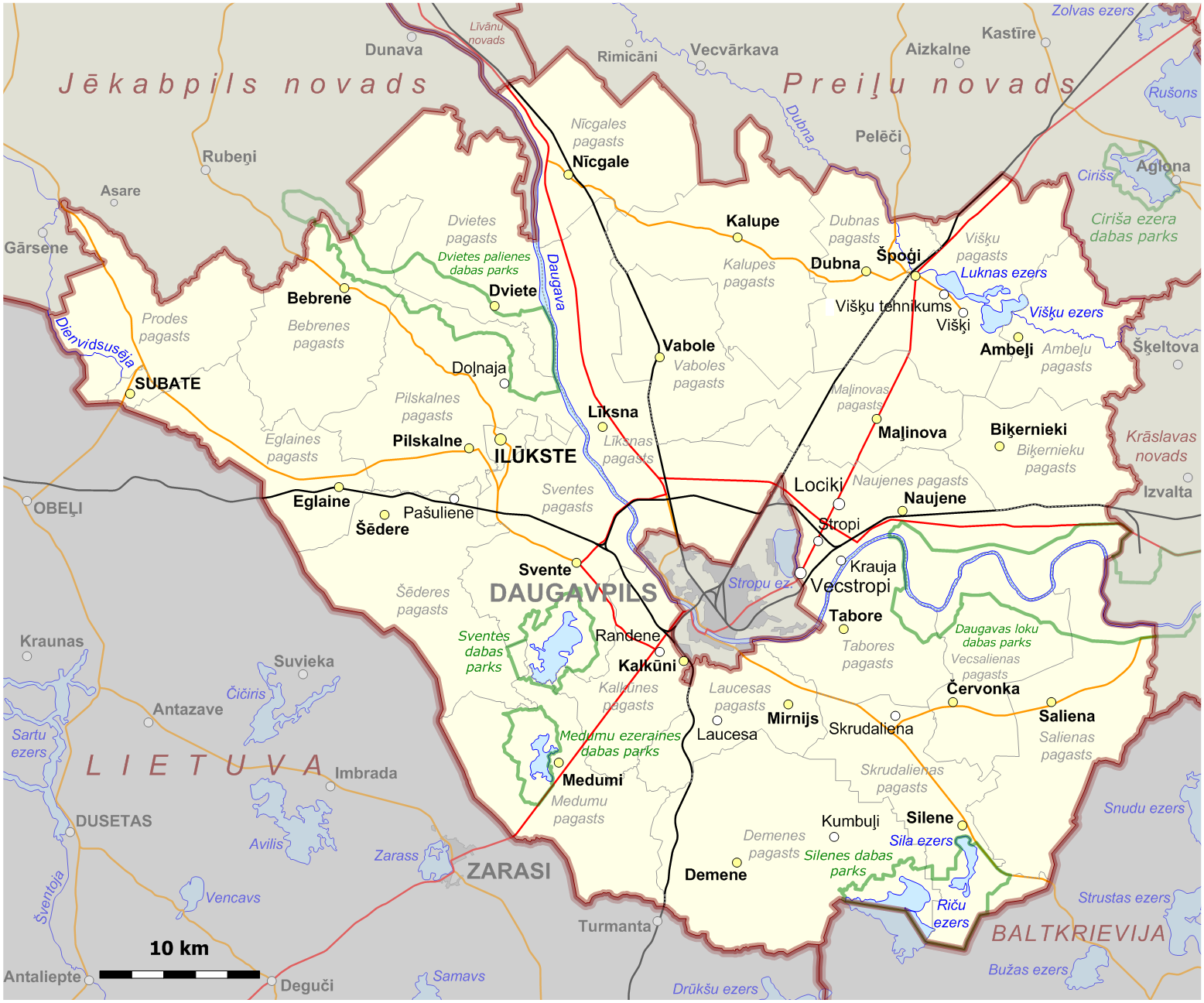
- Coordinates: 55.94°N 26.45°E
- Country: Latvia
- Established: 1 July 2021
- Seat: Daugavpils (extraterritorially)

Government
  - Council Chair: Vitālijs Aizbalts (Latgale Party)

Area
  - Total: 2,524 km^{2} (975 sq mi)
- Highest elevation (Egļukalns): 220.6 m (724 ft)

Population
  - Estimate (1 January 2025): 24,043
- Time zone: UTC+2 (EET)
  - Summer (DST): UTC+3 (EEST)
- Website: www.augsdaugavasnovads.lv

Augšdaugava Municipality (Latvian: Augšdaugavas novads, "upper Daugava municipality") is one of the 35 municipalities established in Latvia in 2021. It surrounds the independent state city of Daugavpils, however, the municipal headquarters are located there, outside of the municipality. Its first elected municipal council has taken office on 1 July 2021.

== Geography ==
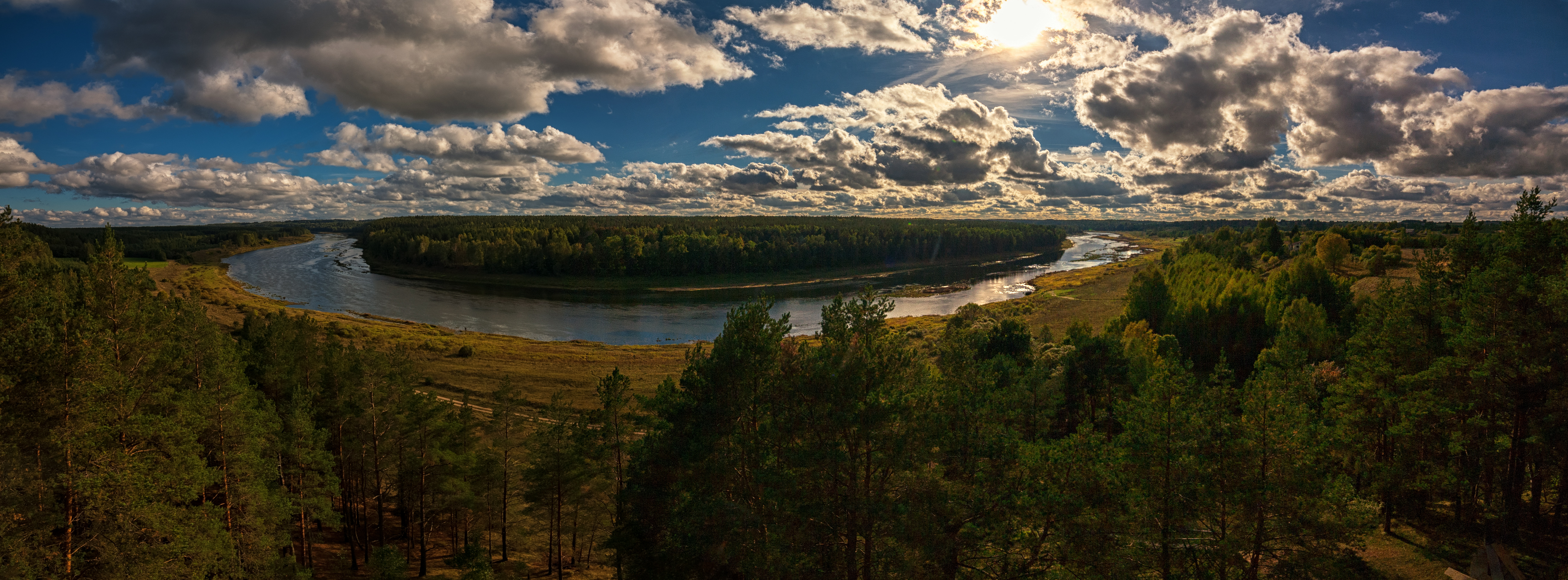
View of the Daugava from the Vasargeliški observation tower east of Daugavpils.

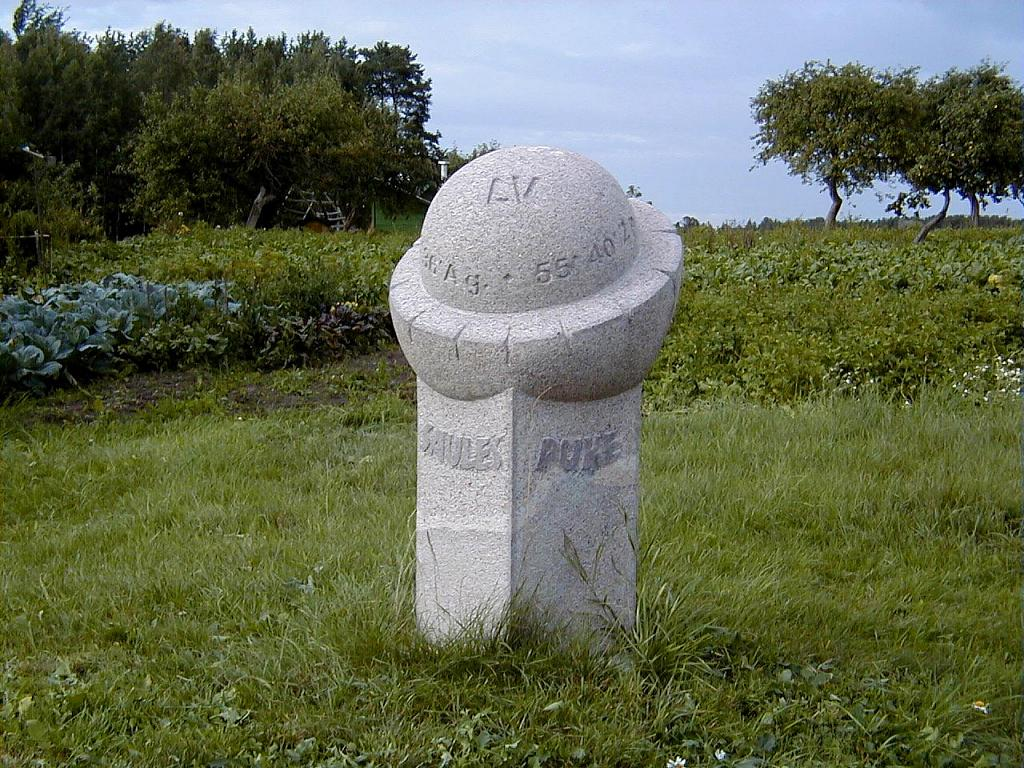
Saules puķe ("Sunflower"), Vilnis Titāns, 1999: granite sculpture placed near the southernmost point of Latvia in Demene Parish.

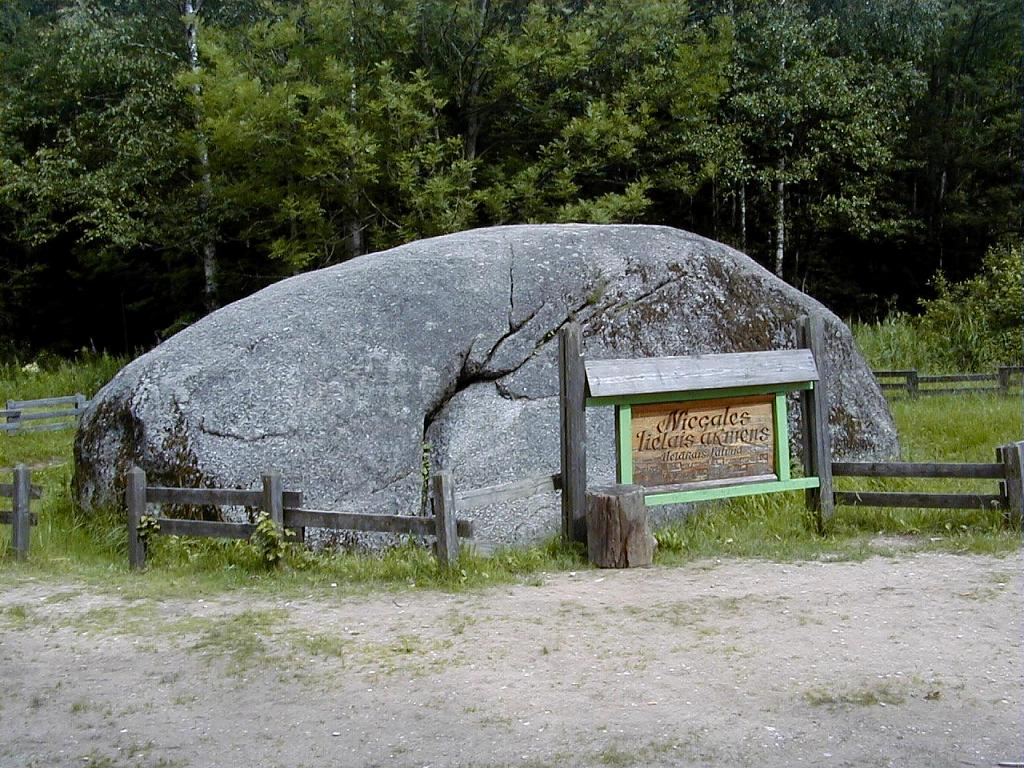
The Great Stone of Nīcgale in Nīcgale Parish.

Augšdaugava Municipality covers an area of 2,524 square kilometres (975 sq mi). It is located in the southwestern part of the Latgale region in eastern Latvia, and surrounds the city of Daugavpils on all sides. It borders Jēkabpils Municipality to the northwest, Līvāni Municipality to the north, Preiļi Municipality to the northeast, and Krāslava Municipality to the east. It also borders the Lithuanian counties of Panevėžys and Utena to the west and southwest respectively, and Vitebsk Region in Belarus to the southeast. The southernmost point of Latvia is located on the border with Lithuania in Demene Parish, and is commemorated with a nearby sculpture by Vilnis Titāns.

The Augšzeme ("highland") region is located in the south-central part of the municipality and is a Protected Landscape with an area of 208.13 square kilometres (80.36 sq mi). Lake Svente and Lake Medumi are found within the protected area. Also located in the area is Egļukalns, the highest point of the municipality with an elevation of 220.6 metres (724 ft) above sea level. It is the site of a ski resort.

The Daugava flows into the municipality from the east and turns north at Daugavpils. The Daugava valley east of Daugavpils is a Protected Landscape Area which extends into Krāslava Municipality.

A third Protected Landscape Area located in the northern part of the municipality is Nīcgale forest in Nīcgale Parish. The Great Stone of Nīcgale is located on its eastern boundary and is the largest glacial erratic known in Latvia with a volume of approximately 170 cubic metres (6,000 cu ft).

== History ==
Augšdaugava Municipality corresponds in extent to the former Daugavpils district as it existed from 1967 to 2009. In the 2009 territorial reforms, Daugavpils district was divided into the municipalities of Daugavpils and Ilūkste. In 2020, the Saeima approved reducing the number of administrative divisions at the municipal level from 119 to 42, including rejoining the municipalities of Daugavpils and Ilūkste to form Augšdaugava Municipality. Elections for Latvia's new municipal councils were held on 5 June 2021, and the new municipalities including Augšdaugava went into effect on 1 July 2021.

== Administration ==
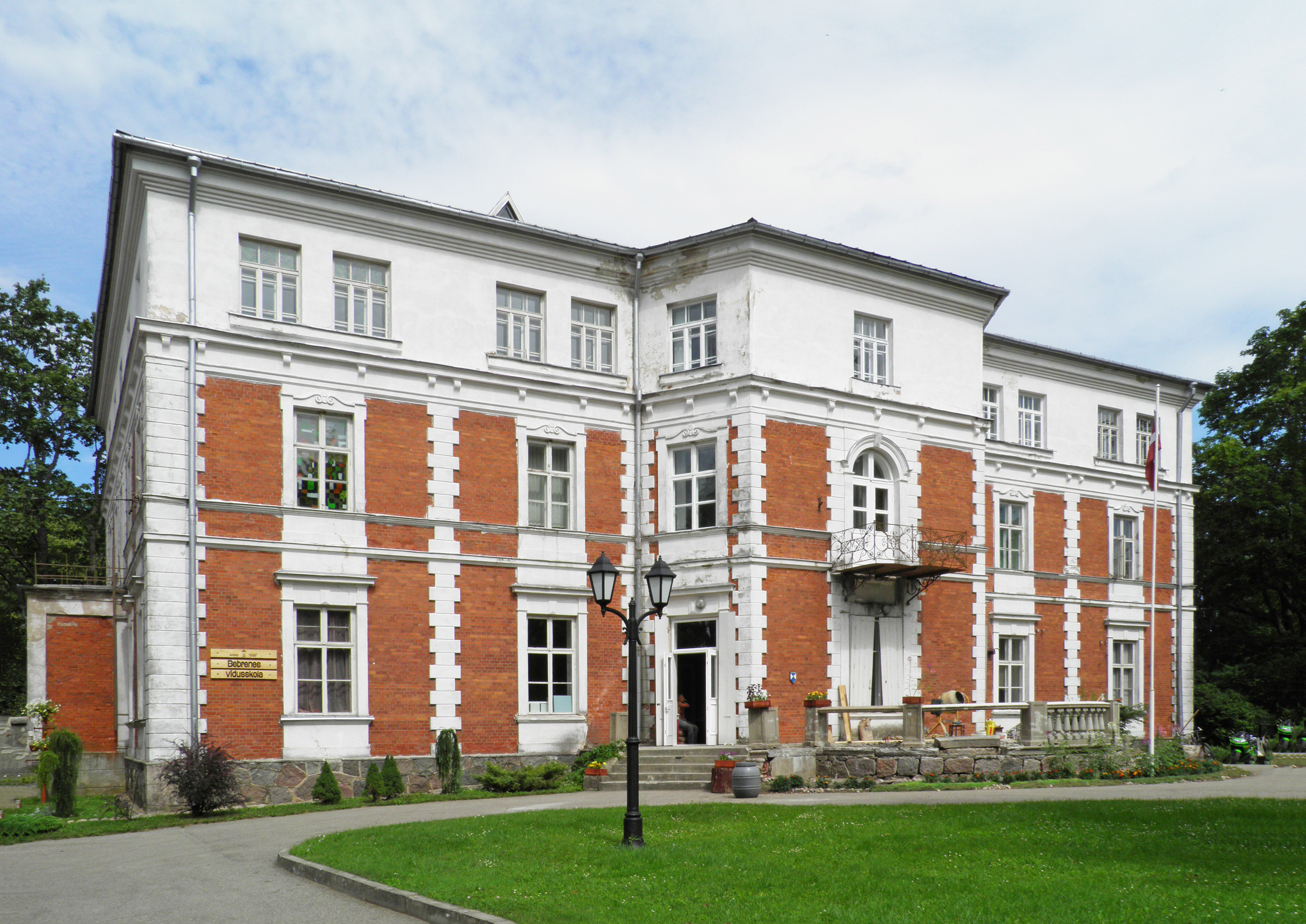
Bebrene Manor in Bebrene Parish.

Augšdaugava Municipality elected 15 councillors in the 2021 local elections. The municipality is to form joint authorities with the city of Daugavpils for the administration of civil protection, education, and waste management.

The municipality is subdivided into two towns and 25 parishes:

Towns

- Ilūkste
- Subate

Parishes

- Ambeļi Parish
- Bebrene Parish
- Biķernieki Parish
- Demene Parish
- Dubna Parish
- Dviete Parish
- Eglaine Parish
- Kalkūne Parish
- Kalupe Parish
- Laucesa Parish
- Līksna Parish
- Maļinova Parish
- Medumi Parish
- Naujene Parish
- Nīcgale Parish
- Pilskalne Parish
- Prode Parish
- Saliena Parish
- Šēdere Parish
- Skrudaliena Parish
- Svente Parish
- Tabore Parish
- Vabole Parish
- Vecsaliena Parish
- Višķi Parish

== Demographics ==
The Central Statistical Bureau of Latvia estimated a population of 25,927 living in what is now Augšdaugava Municipality at the beginning of 2021. This represented a 39% decrease from its estimated population of 42,483 at the beginning of 2000, and a 22% decrease from its estimated population of 33,222 at the beginning of 2011.

The populations of the towns of Ilūkste and Subate were estimated to be 2169 and 596 respectively at the beginning of 2021.

== Economy and infrastructure ==
Augšdaugava is primarily an agricultural municipality: in 2005, 71% of the total area of the former Daugavpils district was used for agricultural purposes, mainly cereal and cattle farming. The municipality is served by national roads A6, which connects Daugavpils to Jēkabpils and Riga to the northwest, and Krāslava and the Belarusian border to the east; A13, which runs from the Lithuanian border southwest of Daugavpils through Daugavpils and Rēzekne and the Russian border northeast of Kārsava; and A14, a western bypass of Daugavpils. The Riga–Daugavpils gas pipeline and the defunct Unecha–Polotsk–Ventspils branch of the Druzhba oil pipeline also run through the municipality. Daugavpils International Airport is located at Lociki in Augšdaugava Municipality northeast of Daugavpils.

== Notable people ==
- Gotthard Friedrich Stender (1714 in Laši, Eglaines Parish – 1796), a Baltic German Lutheran pastor, grammarian and lexicographer
- Edward Ropp (1851 near Līksna – 1939), a Polish Baltic German nobleman, Bishop of Vilnius and Roman Catholic metropolitan archbishop of Mogilev in Belarus
- Armin von Gerkan (1885 in Subate – 1969), a Baltic German classical archaeologist
- Eliezer Palchinsky (1912 in Višķi – 2007), a Rosh yeshiva in Jerusalem for nearly 60 years.
- Jan Purwinski (1934 near Ilūkste – 2021), Ukrainian Roman Catholic prelate, the Bishop of the Diocese of Kyiv-Zhytomyr, 1991 to 2011
- Akvelīna Līvmane (born 1951 in Dubna Parish), a Latvian actress and astrologer.

=== Sport ===
- Afanasijs Kuzmins (born 1947 in Biķernieki Parish), sports shooter, gold and silver medalist at the 1988 and 1992 Summer Olympics
- Agris Elerts (born 1967 in Ilūkste), luger, he competed at the 1992 and the 1994 Winter Olympics
- Andris Vaņins (born 1980 in Ilūkste), a football goalkeeper who played 485 games and 100 for Latvia
- Ritus Krjauklis (born 1986 in Ilūkste), footballer who has played over 300 games and 22 for Latvia
