= Nīcgale forest =

Protected landscape area

Nīcgale Forest Protected Landscape
- Nīcgales meži
- IUCN category V (protected landscape/seascape)
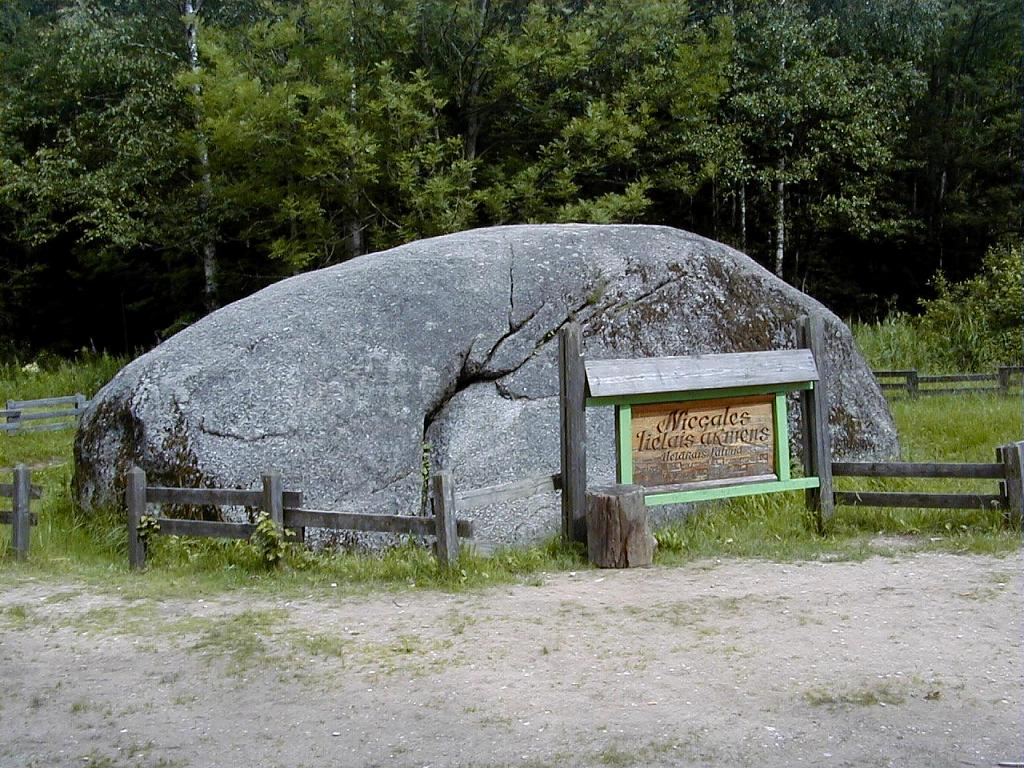
- Nicgale Great Stone

- Location within Latvia
- Location: Latvia, Latgalia
- Coordinates: 56°09′19″N 26°25′50″E
- Area: 9.15 km^{2} (3.53 sq mi)
- Established: 2004

Nīcgale forest is Latvia protected landscape area in the Latgale region, in the Nīcgale Parish of Augšdaugava Municipality, east of Nīcgale. At the eastern point of the territory is Nicgale Great Stone.

The site contains EU Habitats Directive habitats - old or natural boreal forests, old mixed broadleaf forests, walking forests. This is the Natura 2000 area.

== Flora ==
A large number of protected plant species are found here, including ramsons (Allium ursinum), clustered bur-reed (Sparganium glomeratum), downy buttercup (Ranunculus lanuginosus), Lyon's notchwort (Tritomaria quinquedentata).

One of the species of flowering plants - hairy agrimony (Agrimonia pilosa) is protected under EU Nature directives.

== Fauna ==
Nīcgales forest is home to a significant number of butterfly species, including marsh fritillary (Euphydryas aurinia), Scarce fritillary (Euphydryas maturna, (Lycaena dispar), scarce heath (Coenonympha hero), woodland brown (Lopinga achine), blue underwing ( Catocala fraxini), Pericallia (Pericallia matronula). Protected fauna species include white-backed woodpecker (Picoides leucotos), middle spotted woodpecker (Leiopicus medius), Ural owl ( Strix uralensis), Eurasian pygmy owl (Glaucidium passerinum).

In total :

- 17 species of birds are protected under EU Nature directives.
- 3 species of invertebrates are protected under EU Nature directives.
