= Sparganium simplex =

Sparganium simplex can refer to:

- Sparganium simplex Huds., a synonym of Sparganium emersum Rehmann
- Sparganium simplex Muhl., a synonym of Sparganium angustifolium Michx.
