= Floating bur-reed =

Floating bur-reed is a common name for several plants and may refer to:

- Sparganium angustifolium
- Sparganium fluctuans, native to North America
