= Lāčplēsis (disambiguation) =

Lāčplēsis (lit. 'Bear-Slayer') is the national epic of Latvia, best known from the 1888 version by Andrejs Pumpurs.

It may also refer to:

- Lāčplēsis (rock opera), based on the epic by Zigmars Liepiņš, Māra Zālīte and Raimonds Pauls
- Lāčplēsis (film), a 1930 Latvian silent feature film
- Order of Lāčplēsis, military decoration of Latvia for World War I (1914–1918) and the Latvian War of Independence (1918–20)
- Lāčplēsis Day, Latvian memorial day on November 11 for independence activists
- Lāčplēsis, Birzgales Parish, a settlement in Birzgale Parish, Latvia
  - Lāčplēsis station, a railway station on the Jelgava–Krustpils Railway in Birzgale Parish
- Lāčplēsis, Lielvārde, a former kolkhoz in the town of Lielvārde
- Lāčplēsis Statue, a key attraction in Jūrmala, Latvia
- Jānis Lāčplēsis (born 1958), Latvian financier and politician
