= Nīcgale Station =

Railway station in Latvia

Nīcgale
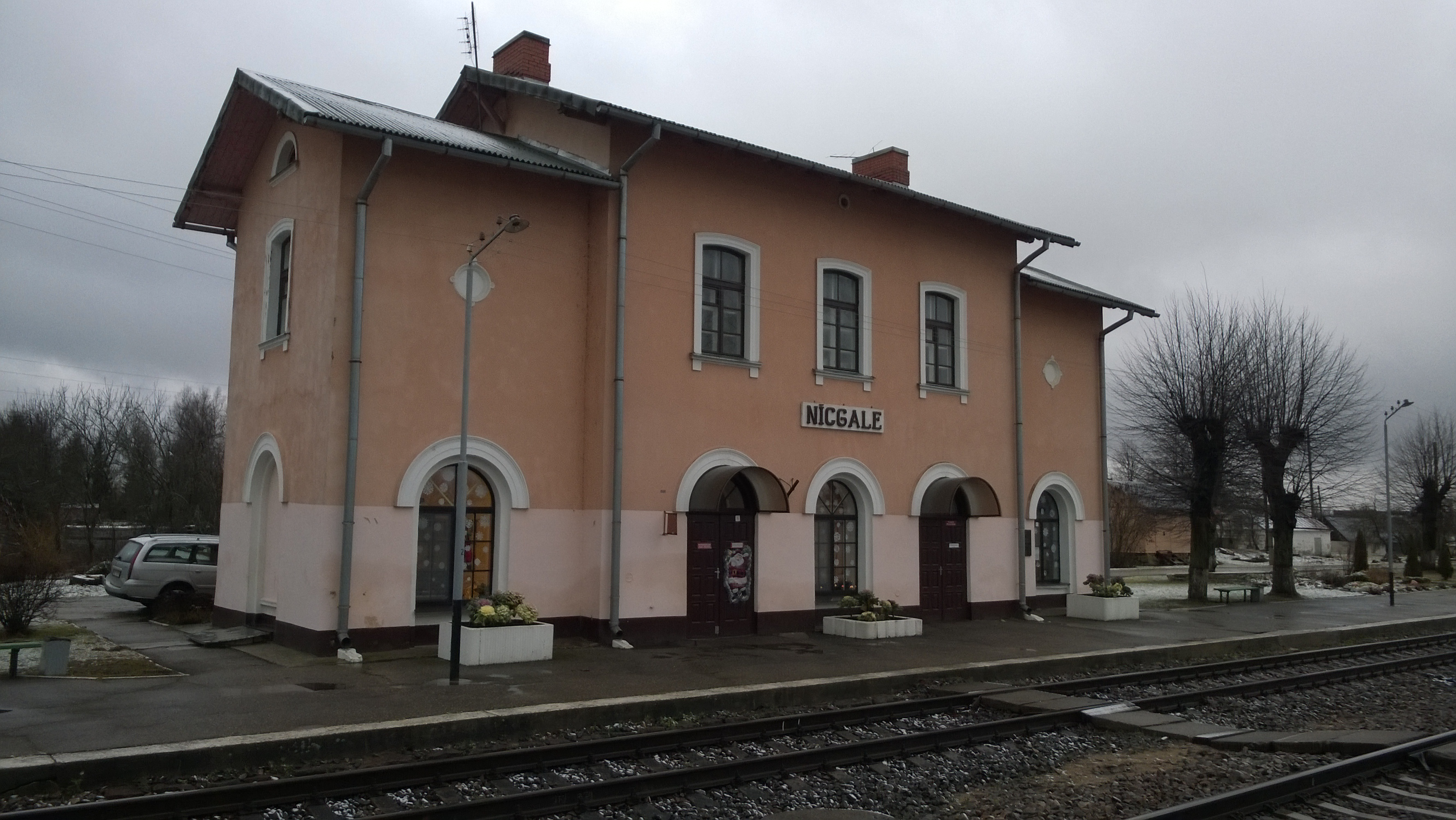

General information
- Location: Nīcgale, Nīcgale Parish, Augšdaugava Municipality
- Coordinates: 56°8′7.49″N 26°22′17.46″E

History
- Opened: 1861
- Former names: Nitzgal

Services
Preceding station	LDz	Following station
Jersika towards Riga	Riga–Daugavpils	Vabole towards Daugavpils
Location
- Location within Latvia railways

Nīcgale Station is a railway station serving the settlement of Nīcgale in the Latgale region of Latvia. It is located on the Riga–Daugavpils Railway.
