= Stow-Cum-Quy Fen =

Protected area in Cambridgeshire, England

Coordinates: 52.242°N 0.216°E

- Site of Special Scientific Interest
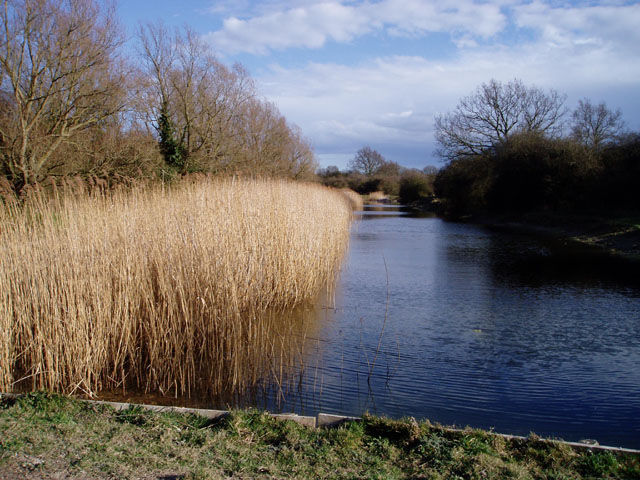
- Location of Stow-Cum-Quy Fen.
- Area of search: Cambridgeshire
- Grid reference: TL 514 627
- Interest: Biological
- Area: 29.9 hectares
- Notification date: 1986
- Location map: Magic Map

Stow-Cum-Quy Fen is a 29.9-hectare (74-acre) biological Site of Special Scientific Interest west of Lode in Cambridgeshire. Most of it is common land.

The site is calcareous loam pasture, with diverse flora and open pools which have rare aquatic plants. Grassland herbs include purging flax and salad burnet, and there are aquatic plants such as unbranched bur-reed, mare's tail and bladderwort.

There is access to the site by footpaths from Lode and Horningsea.
