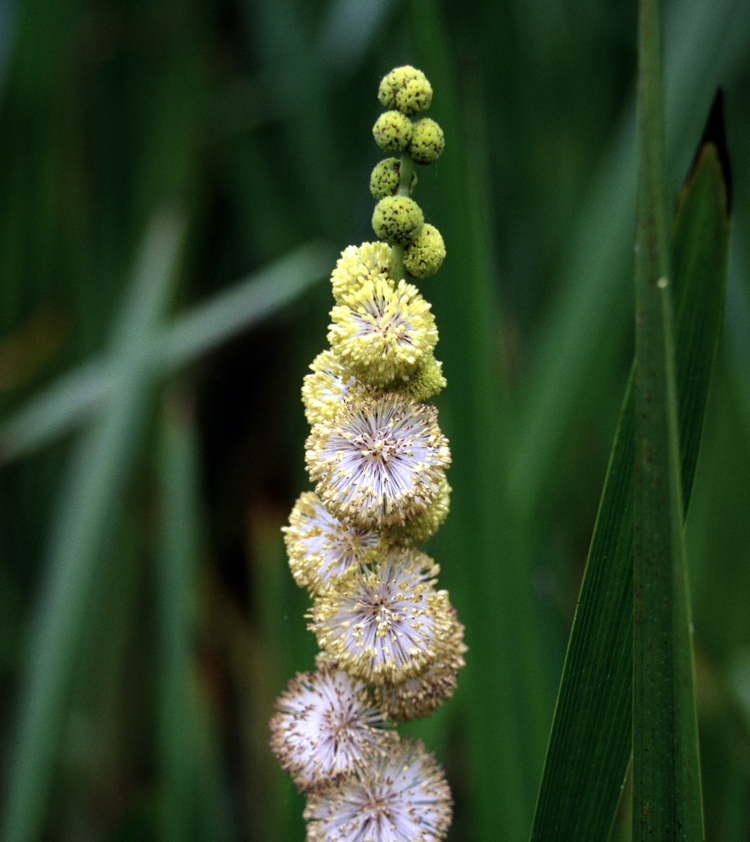

Conservation status
- Least Concern (IUCN 3.1)

Scientific classification
- Kingdom: Plantae
- Clade: Tracheophytes
- Clade: Angiosperms
- Clade: Monocots
- Clade: Commelinids
- Order: Poales
- Family: Typhaceae
- Genus: Sparganium
- Species: S. eurycarpum

Binomial name
- Sparganium eurycarpum Engelm.

Synonyms
- Sparganium californicum

= Sparganium eurycarpum =

Species of flowering plant

Sparganium eurycarpum is a species of bur-reed known by the common names broadfruit bur-reed and giant bur-reed. It is native to wetlands in Eurasia and North America. It is a clonal perennial, spreading by below-ground rhizomes. The common name, bur-reed, arises from the distinctive round clusters of fruits that take the form of a mace. It can be distinguished from all other species of bur-reed by the presence of two stigmas.

This species frequently occurs in areas with spring flooding, and may be emersed during periods of lower water. The buried rhizomes provide one method to survive periods of drought, fire, or ice scour. The flowers are wind pollinated, the male flower clusters being separate and more highly elevated than the female. It also produces large seeds, which can accumulate in the soil as buried reserves. It can form dense stands under the right conditions; for example, Sparganium is one of the four main vegetation types in the Ottawa River, Canada. Muskrats feed on the plant, particularly its rhizomes, while the seeds are an important food source for waterfowl.
