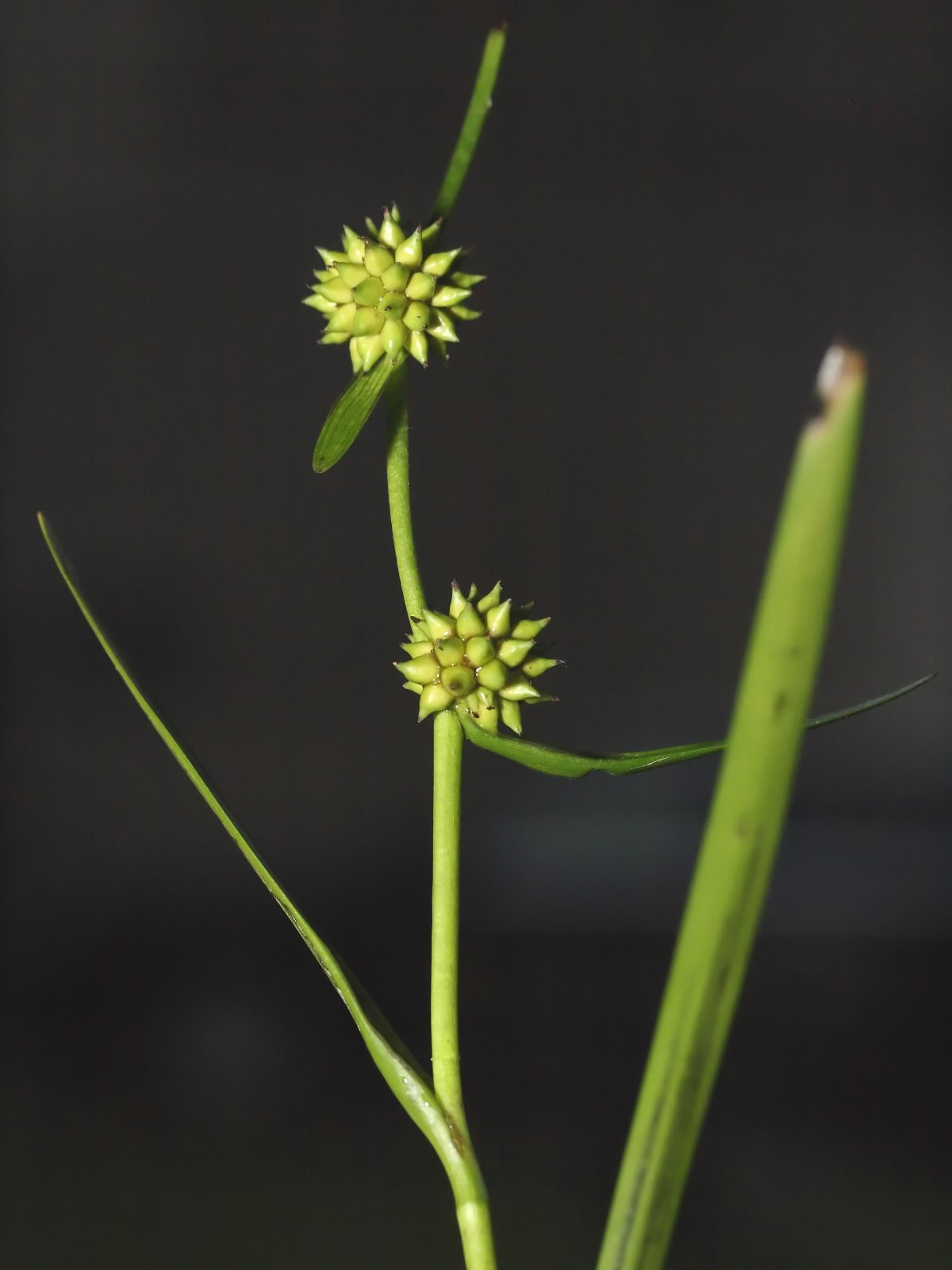

Conservation status
- Least Concern (IUCN 3.1)

Scientific classification
- Kingdom: Plantae
- Clade: Tracheophytes
- Clade: Angiosperms
- Clade: Monocots
- Clade: Commelinids
- Order: Poales
- Family: Typhaceae
- Genus: Sparganium
- Species: S. natans

Binomial name
- Sparganium natans L.

Synonyms
- Sparganium minimum

= Sparganium natans =

Species of aquatic plant

Sparganium natans is a species of bur-reed known by the common names least bur-reed and small bur-reed. It is a water circumboreal plant inhabiting North America, Europe, West Asia and Japan. It is usually found submersed in shallow, calm water. This bur-reed has thin, flexible, grasslike leaves which float in the water. Plants that spend more time out of water at the waterline are tougher and have shorter leaves. The plant bears two inflorescences, the staminate type being a rounded white filamentous ball and the pistillate type a sphere of thick, green, pointy peduncles. The fruits are small green or brown achenes.
