= Trepe Station =

Railway station in Latvia

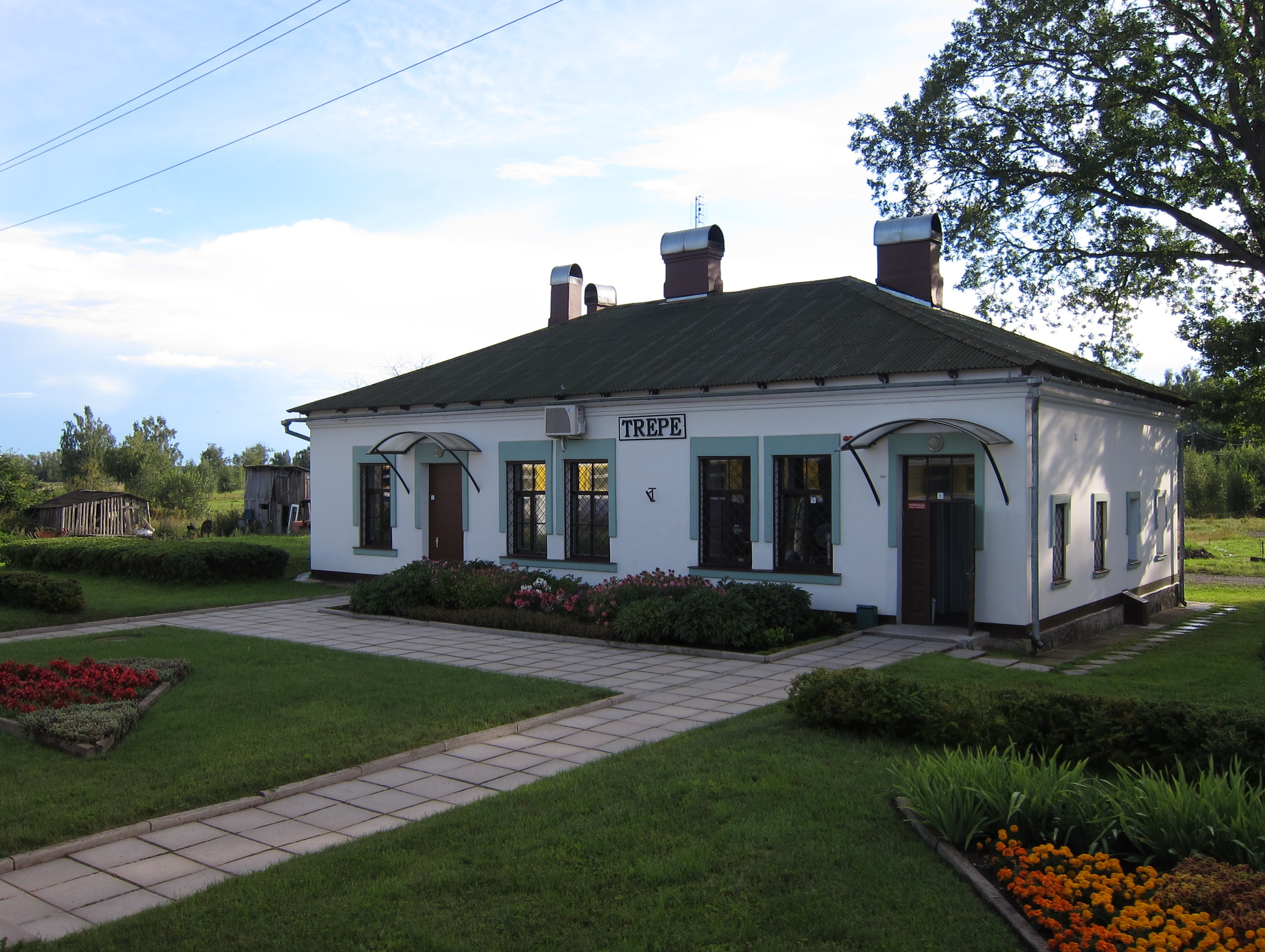
- The station in 2013

General information
- Coordinates: 56°26′19.81″N 26°4′32.80″E
- Line: Riga–Daugavpils Railway

Services
Preceding station	LDz	Following station
Krustpils towards Riga	Riga–Daugavpils	Līvāni towards Daugavpils
Location
- Location within Latvia railways

Trepe Station is a railway station serving the Vīpe Parish in the Latgale region of Latvia. It is located on the Riga–Daugavpils Railway. Only 3 trains per day stop here per direction, with an extra summer evening train to Riga on Sundays.
