= Līvāni Station =

Railway station in Latvia

Līvāni
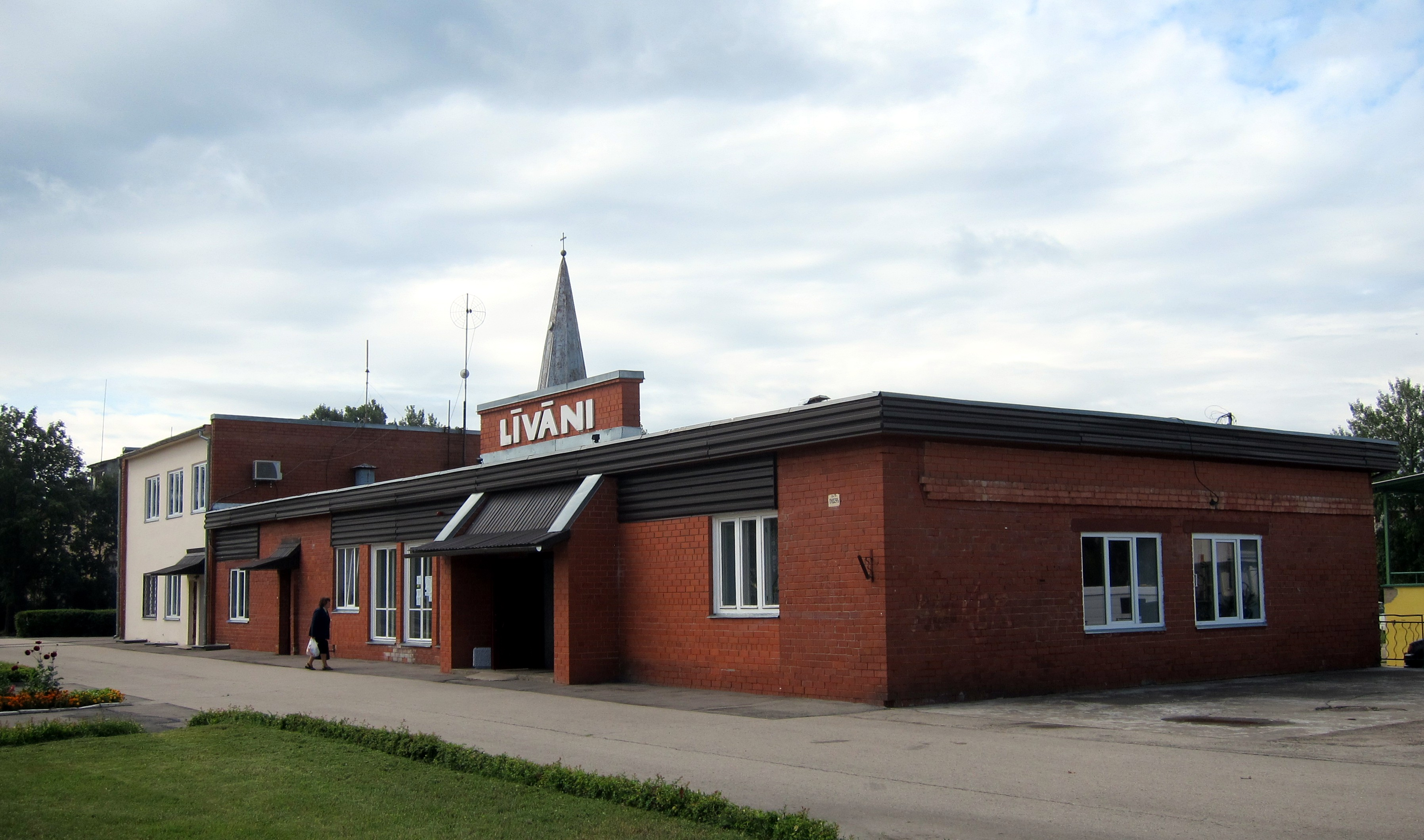

General information
- Location: Stacijas iela 5, Līvāni, Līvāni Municipality
- Coordinates: 56°21′1.65″N 26°10′51.52″E
- Platforms: 3
- Tracks: 5

History
- Opened: 1861
- Former names: Livenhof

Services
Preceding station	LDz	Following station
Trepe towards Riga	Riga–Daugavpils	Jersika towards Daugavpils
Location
- Location within Latvia railways

Līvāni Station is a railway station serving the town of Līvāni in the Latgale region of south-eastern Latvia. It is located on the Riga–Daugavpils Railway. Trains on the route Riga-Daugavpils, Riga-Kraslava, Riga-Indra, Līvāni-Riga, and Riga-Aglona.
