= Krustpils – Rēzekne II Railway =

Railway in Latvia

Krustpils–Rēzekne II Railway
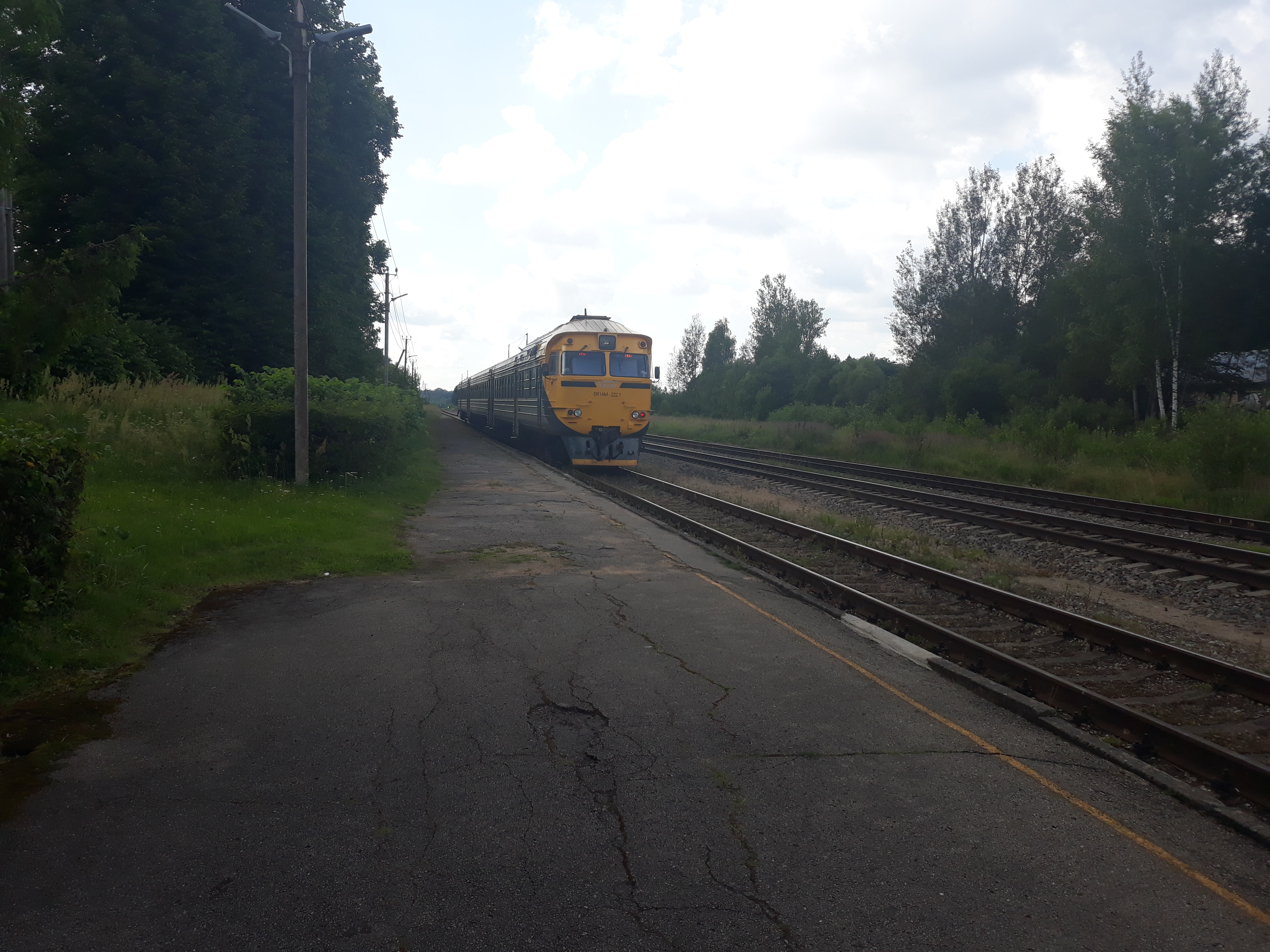

Overview
- Termini: Krustpils Station; Rēzekne II Station

Service
- Operator(s): Latvian Railways

History
- Opened: 1901

Technical
- Line length: 95 km (59.03 mi)
- Track gauge: 1,524 mm (5 ft)

Railway lines in Latvia in 2016.

The Krustpils–Rēzekne II Railway is a 95 kilometres (59 mi) long, 1,524 mm (5 ft) gauge railway built in the 20th century to connect Krustpils and Rēzekne as part of the international Ventspils–Moscow Railway.

== See also ==
- Rail transport in Latvia
- History of rail transport in Latvia

== Bibliography ==
- Altbergs, T.; Augustāne, K.; Pētersone, I. (2009). Dzelzceļi Latvijā [Railways in Latvia] (in Latvian). Jumava. ISBN 978-9984-38-698-0.
