= Nīcgale =

Village in Latvia

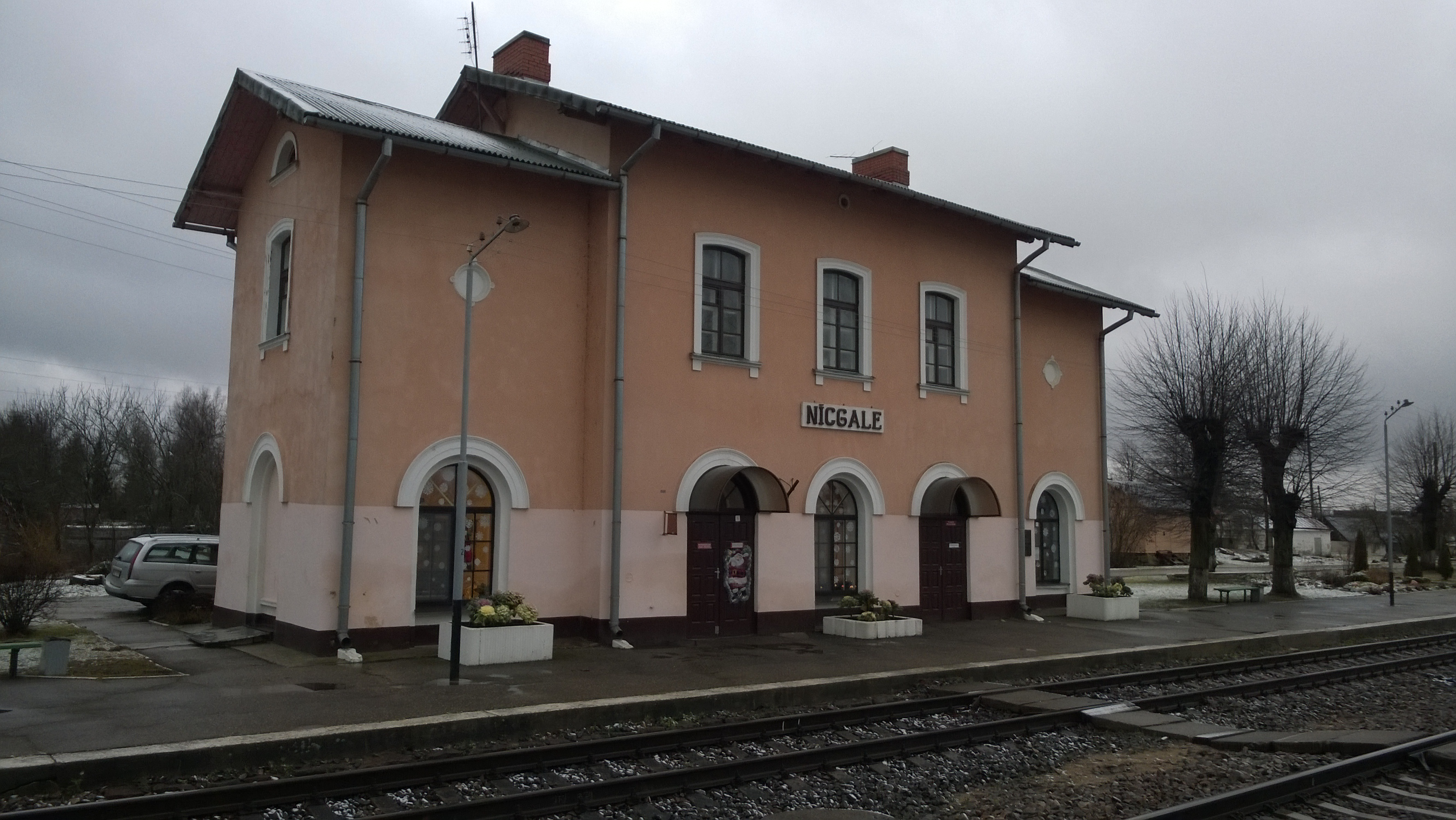
- Nīcgale railway station

- Location within Latvia
- Coordinates: 56°8′6″N 26°21′52″E
- Country: Latvia
- Municipality: Augšdaugava Municipality

Population (2009)
  - Total: 561
- Time zone: UTC+2 (EET)
  - Summer (DST): UTC+3 (EEST)

Nīcgale (Latvian: Nīcgale; Latgalian: Neicgaļs) is a settlement in Nīcgale Parish, Augšdaugava Municipality in the Latgale region of Latvia.

== See also ==
- Nīcgale forest
