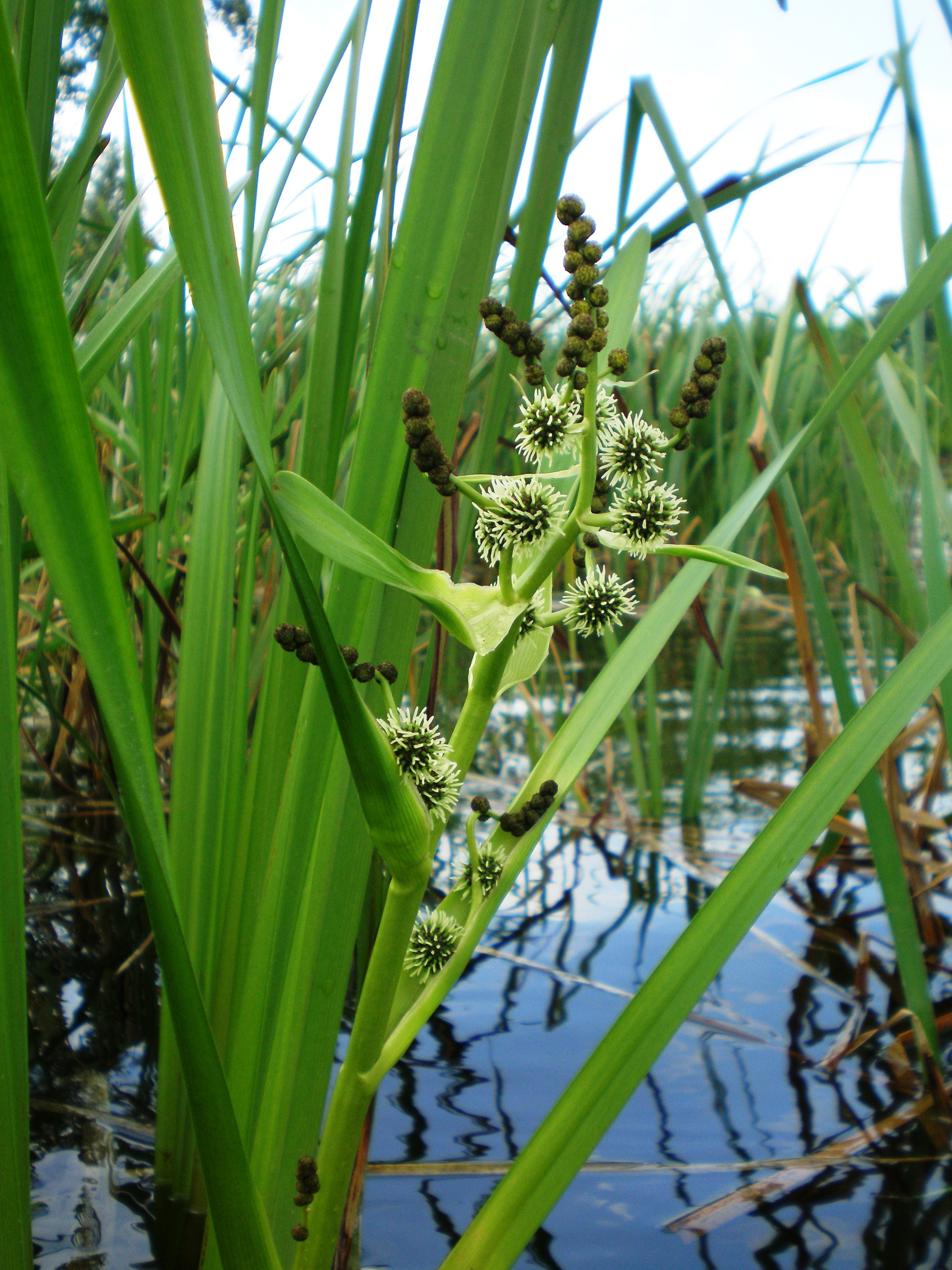

Conservation status
- Least Concern (IUCN 3.1)

Scientific classification
- Kingdom: Plantae
- Clade: Tracheophytes
- Clade: Angiosperms
- Clade: Monocots
- Clade: Commelinids
- Order: Poales
- Family: Typhaceae
- Genus: Sparganium
- Species: S. erectum

Binomial name
- Sparganium erectum L.

= Sparganium erectum =

Species of flowering plant

Sparganium erectum, the simplestem bur-reed or branched bur-reed, is a perennial plant species in the genus Sparganium.

The larvae of the moth Plusia festucae feed on Sparganium erectum.

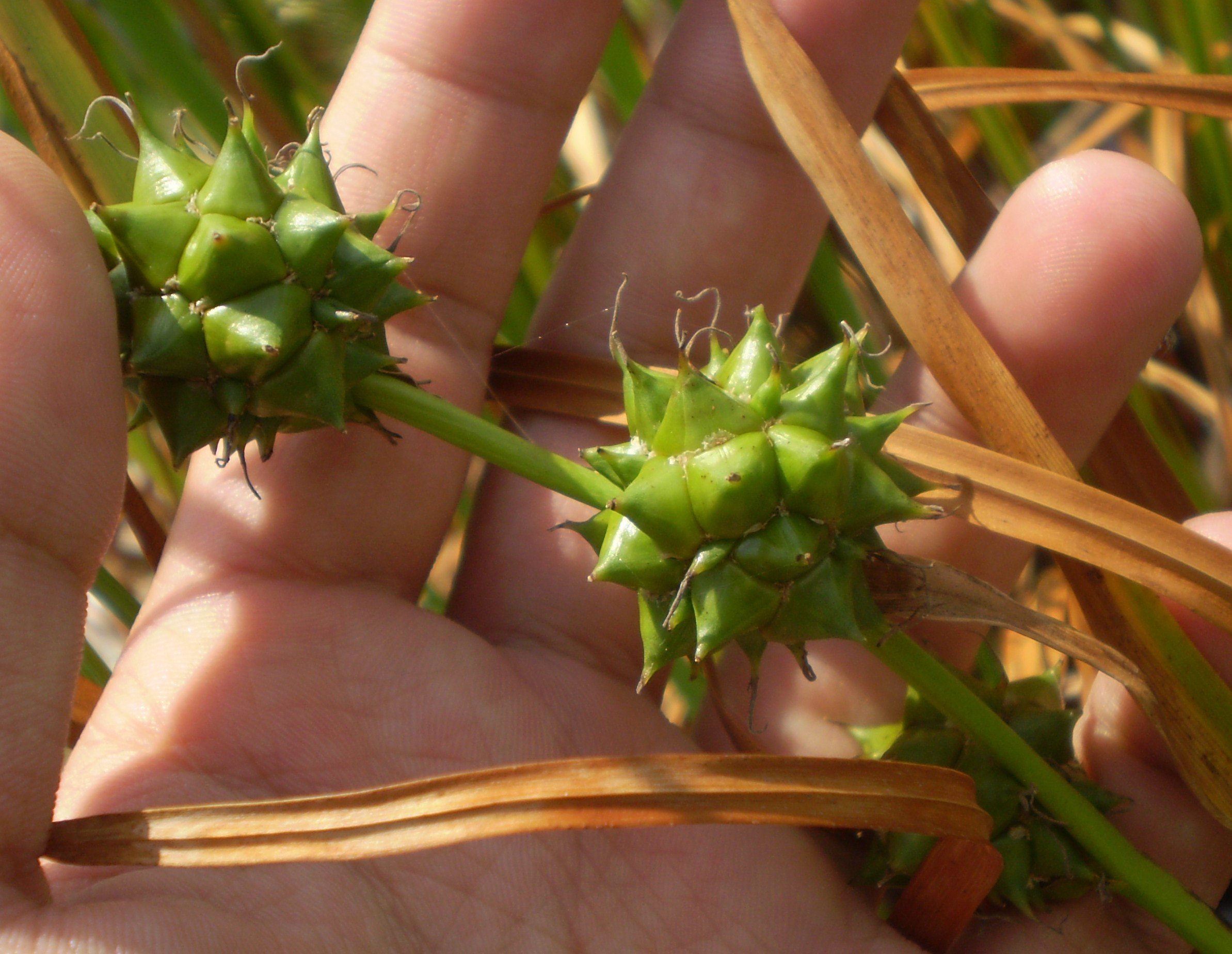
Fruits

Subspecies:

- Sparganium erectum subsp. microcarpum (Neuman) Domin (synonym: Sparganium microcarpum (Neuman) Celak.)
