= Krustpils Station =

Railway station in Latvia

Krustpils
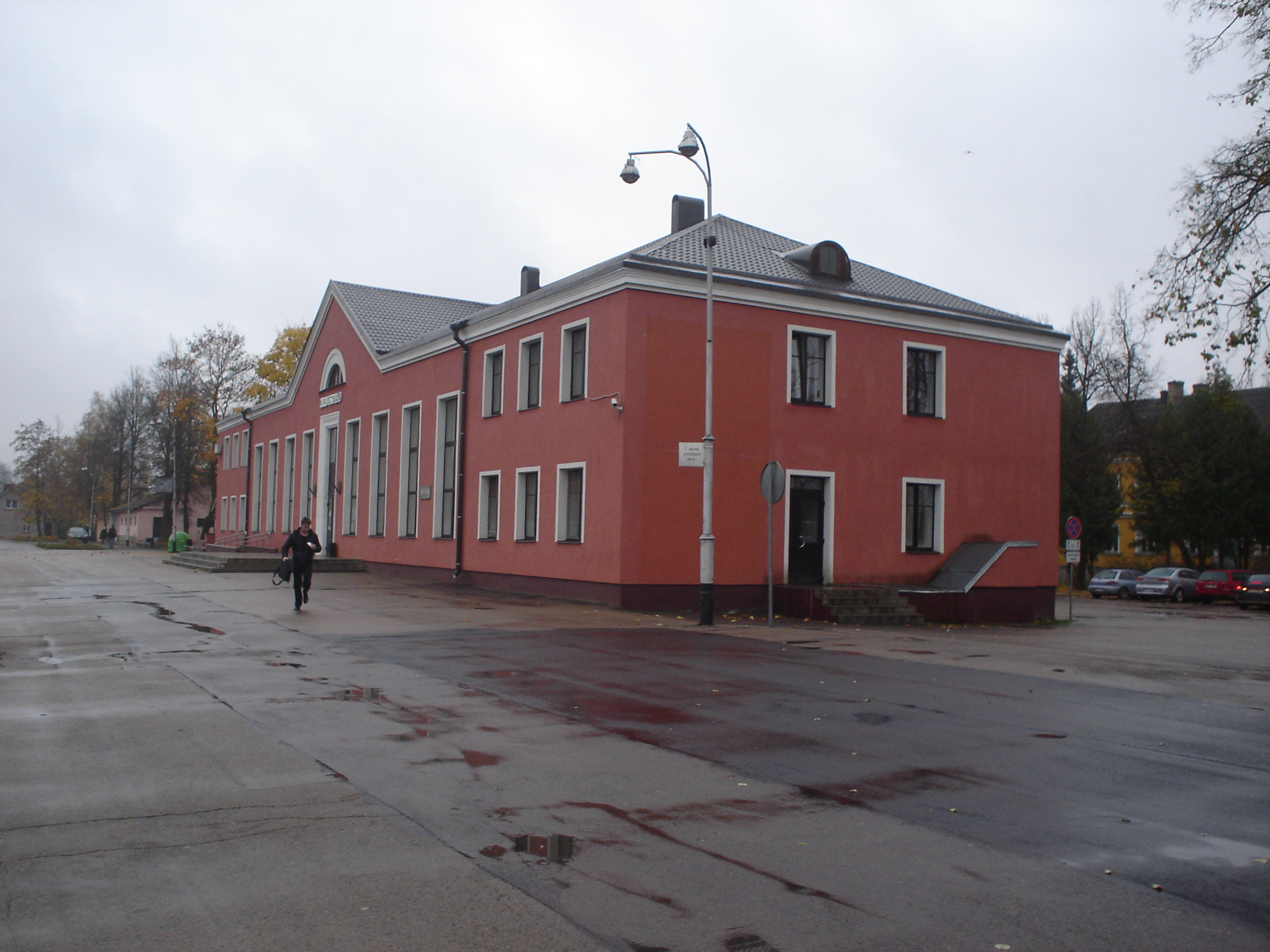
- Krustpils Station in 2012

General information
- Location: Stacijas laukums 1 Jēkabpils, Jēkabpils Municipality; Latvia
- Coordinates: 56°31′14.32″N 25°51′34.46″E
- Lines: Riga–Daugavpils; Jelgava–Krustpils; Krustpils–Rēzekne
- Platforms: 3
- Tracks: 8

History
- Opened: 1861
- Rebuilt: 1954
- Former names: Kreutzburg

Services
Preceding station	LDz	Following station
Pļaviņas towards Riga	Riga–Daugavpils	Trepe towards Daugavpils
Terminus	Krustpils – Rēzekne II	Kūkas towards Rēzekne II
Location
- Location within Latvia railways

Krustpils Station is a railway station serving the city of Jēkabpils in southeastern Latvia. The station is located in the historic Krustpils part of the city on the right bank of the river Daugava.

The station is an important railway junction. It is located on the Riga–Daugavpils railway line roughly halfway between Riga and Daugavpils, and is the terminus of the Jelgava–Krustpils and Krustpils–Rēzekne railway lines.
