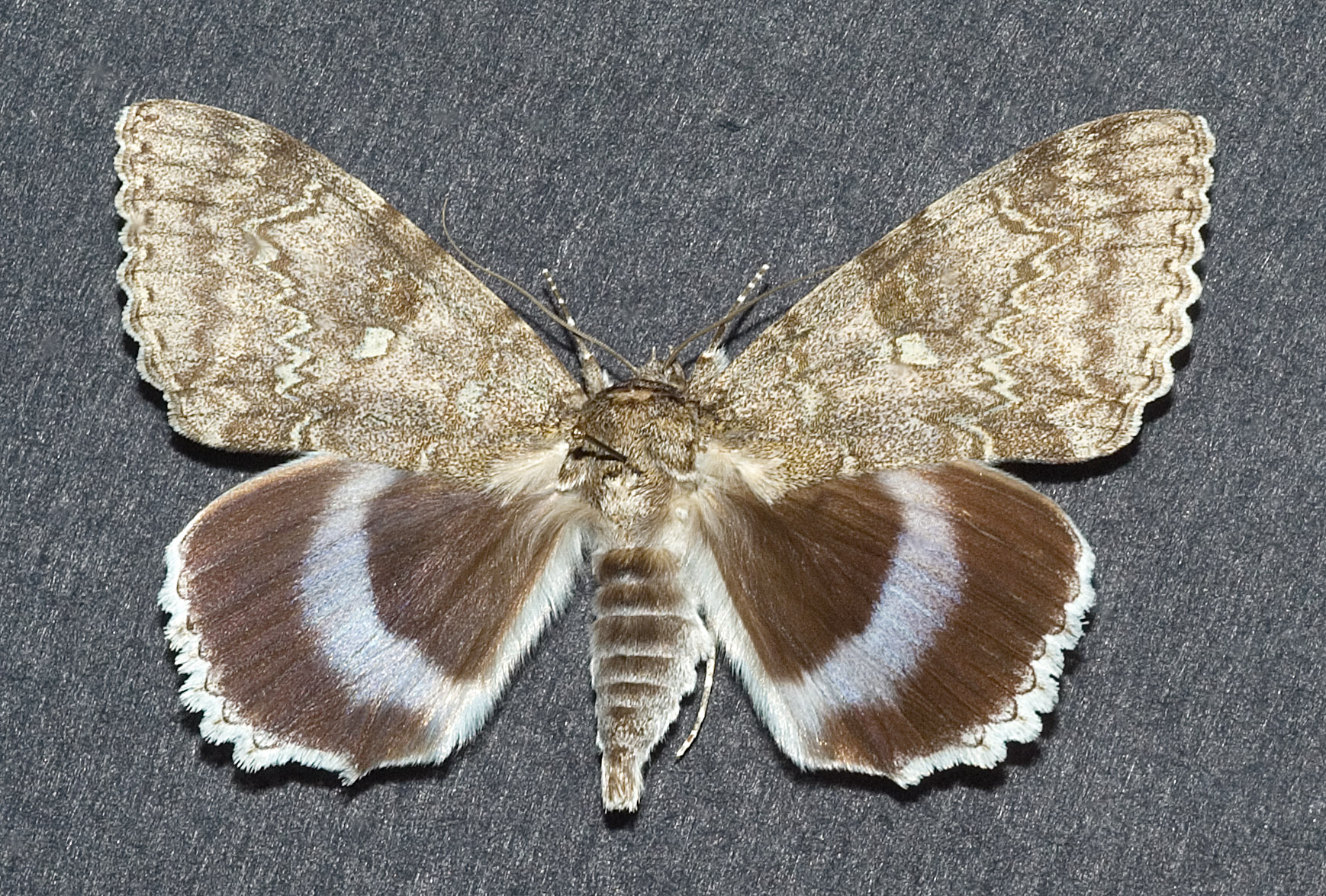

Scientific classification
- Kingdom: Animalia
- Phylum: Arthropoda
- Class: Insecta
- Order: Lepidoptera
- Superfamily: Noctuoidea
- Family: Erebidae
- Genus: Catocala
- Species: C. fraxini

Binomial name
- Catocala fraxini (Linnaeus, 1758)

Synonyms
- Phalaena fraxini Linnaeus, 1758; Catocala fraxini var. gaudens Staudinger, 1901; Catocala fraxini var. latefasciata Warnecke, 1919; Catocala jezoensis Matsumura, 1931

= Catocala fraxini =

Blue underwing

Species of moth

Catocala fraxini, the blue underwing or Clifden nonpareil, is a moth of the family Erebidae. The species was first described by Carl Linnaeus in his 1758 10th edition of Systema Naturae.

== Distribution ==
The distribution area covers almost the entire central and northern Europe, as well as parts of southern Europe. The species is largely missing in Portugal, the Mediterranean islands (except Corsica), in Greece, in northern Scotland, in northern Scandinavia and north and in southern Russia. The distribution area stretches across the Palearctic to northern Turkey, Siberia, Russian Far East, Korea and Japan.

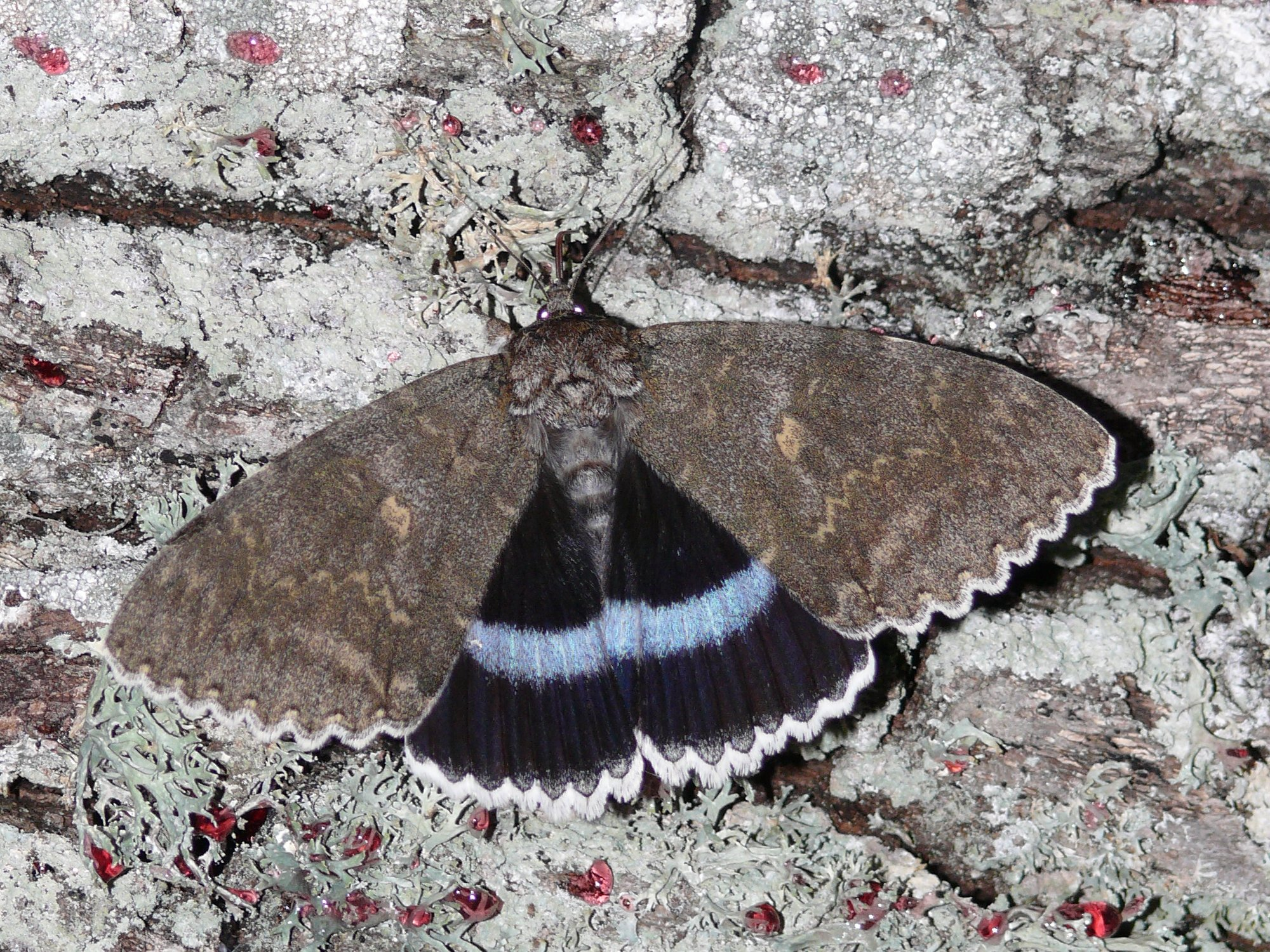

The name "Clifden nonpareil" is derived from the location of the first British records, at the Cliveden estate in Berkshire in the 18th-century, "nonpareil" meaning "without equal" in French. The moth became extinct as a breeding species in Great Britain by the 1960s with post-war changes to forestry, such as when for example, the larval foodplants aspen and poplar were cleared in Orlestone Forest, Kent to make way for conifers. For decades it was a rare migrant from Europe with just single sightings recorded in some years. Larvae have since been found in Sussex and sightings in 2018 suggest it has spread to the Midlands and Wales.

== Technical description and variation ==
Forewing whitish ochreous, irrorated with pale or dark grey, sometimes with a yellow tinge; inner and outer lines blackish, dentate, double; median and subterminal lines blackish, dentate; reniform stigma with black centre and outline; beneath it a pale yellowish diamond-shaped spot outlined with moerens. dark; hindwing blackish, with a broad blue postmedian band. — ab. moerens Fuchs has the forewing more or less strongly suffused throughout with blackish grey, obscuring the markings; — the form gaudens Stgr. on the other hand, from Central Asia, is very pale, with most of the black scaling obsolete; in the ab. contigua Schultz the pale spot below the reniform stigma is elongated outwards to touch the outer line, often, as well as the outer line itself, strongly yellow-tinged, especially noticeable in examples with the ground colour dark; -angustata Schultz is distinguished by the narrowness of the blue band of the hindwing; — the ab. maculata Kusenov shows a white mark at the lower angle of cell of hindwing. Schultz also records an instance of albinism in the forewings, where the grey scales throughout have become white, and the black lines brownish yellow, the hindwings remaining unaltered.

== Subspecies ==
- Catocala fraxini fraxini
- Catocala fraxini jezoensis Matsumura, 1931 (Japan)
- Catocala fraxini legionensis Gómez Bustillo & Vega Escandon, 1975 (Spain)
- Catocala fraxini yuennanensis Mell, 1936 (China: Yunnan)

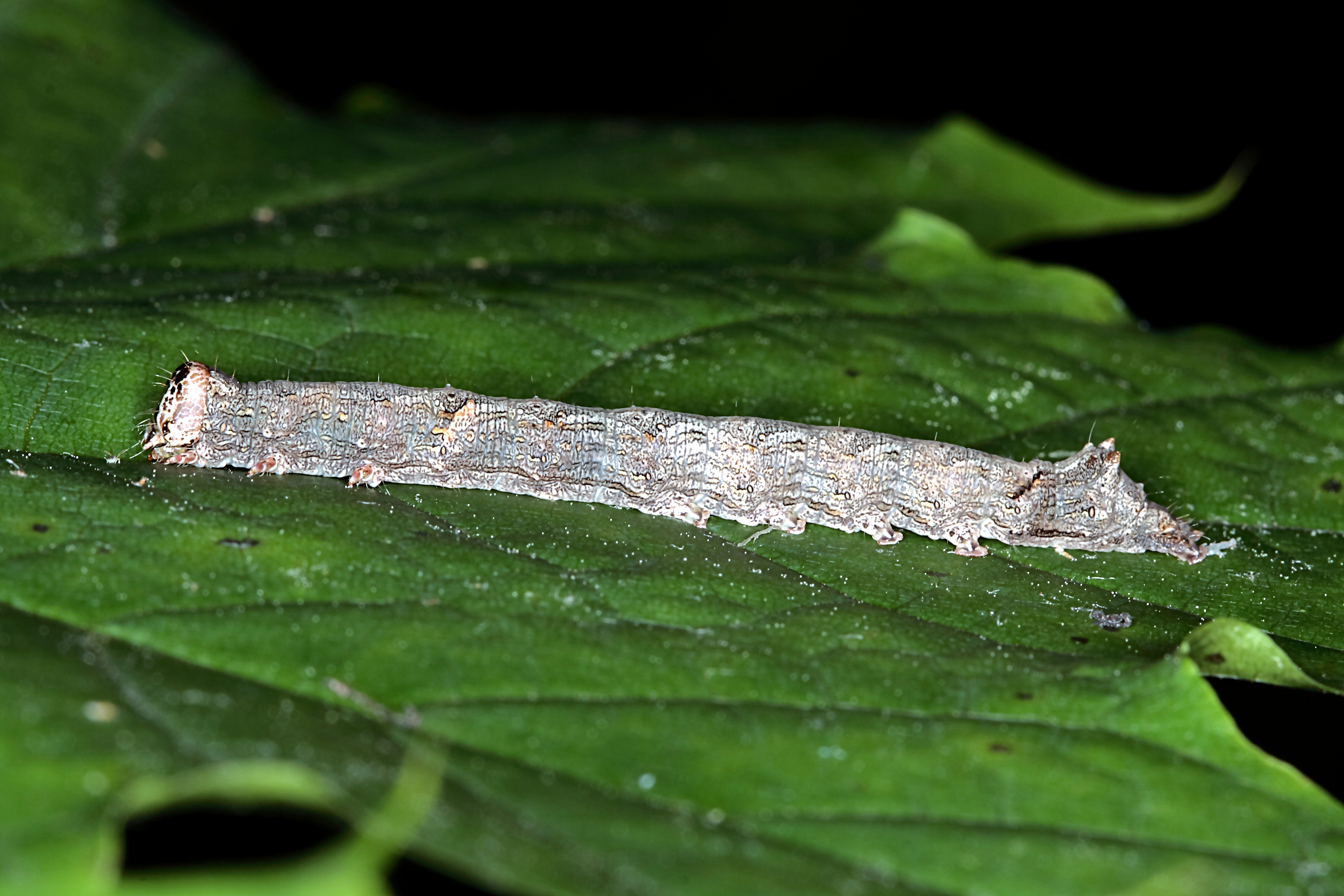
larva

== Biology ==
Larva brownish grey, black speckled, with pointed prominences on segments 9 and 12. The caterpillars feed on various species of poplar (Populus species).
