= Līvāni =

Town and capital of Līvāni Municipality, Latvia

- Town
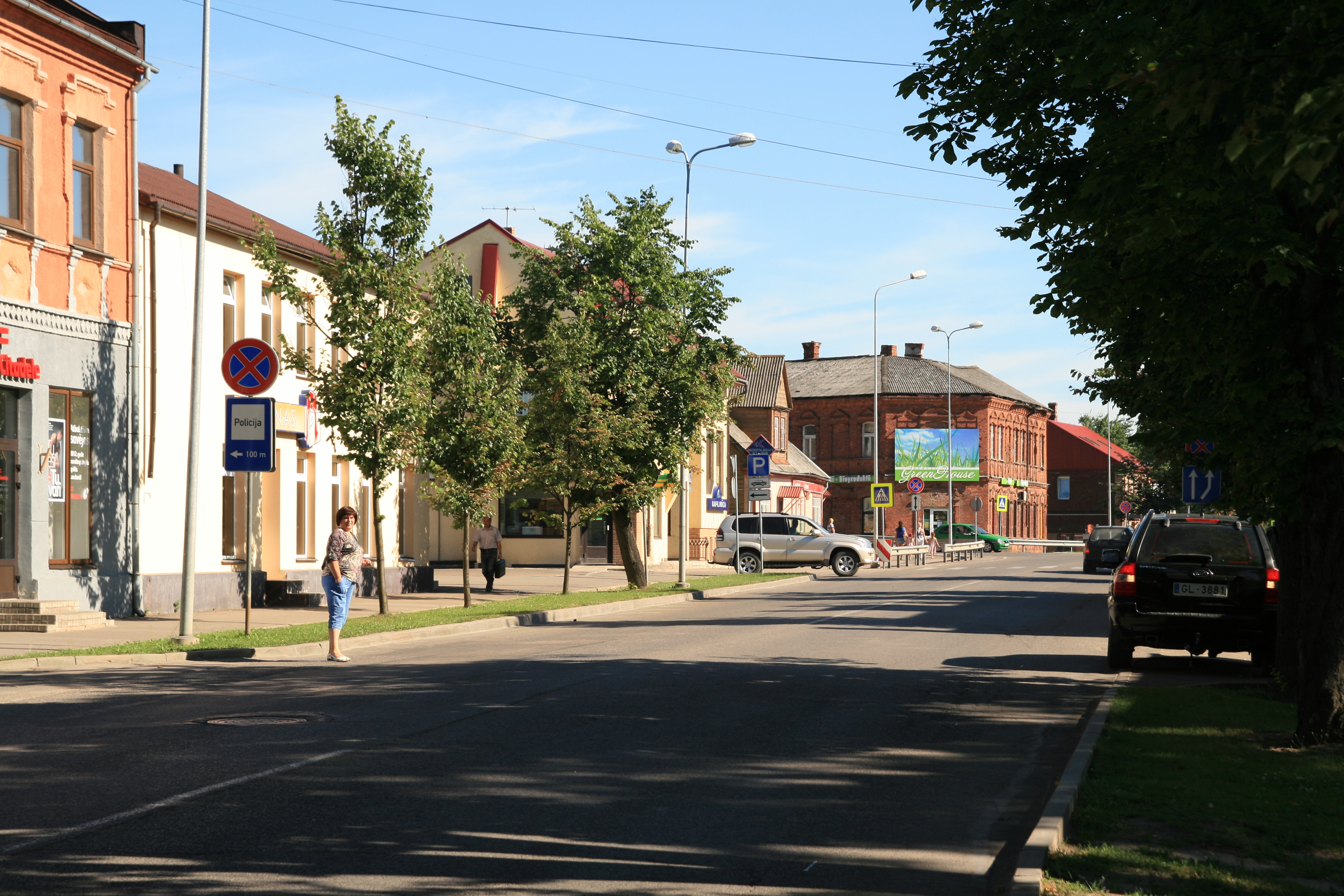
- One of the streets in the centre of Līvāni

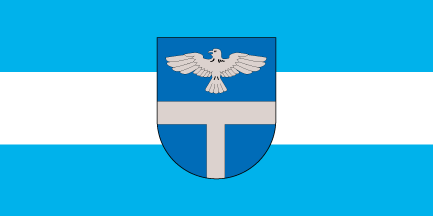
- Flag Coat of arms

- Location in Latvia
- Coordinates: 56°22′N 26°11′E
- Country: Latvia
- Municipality: Līvāni Municipality
- Town rights: 1926

Government
  - Mayor: Dāvids Rubens

Area
  - Total: 6.37 km^{2} (2.46 sq mi)
  - Land: 5.83 km^{2} (2.25 sq mi)
  - Water: 0.54 km^{2} (0.21 sq mi)

Population (2026)
  - Total: 6,626
  - Density: 1,140/km^{2} (2,940/sq mi)
- Time zone: UTC+2 (EET)
  - Summer (DST): UTC+3 (EEST)
- Postal code: LV-5316
- Calling code: +371 653
- Number of city council members: 11
- Website: http://www.livani.lv/

Līvāni (Latgalian: Leivuons; German: Lievenhof) is a town (population approx. 10,000) and the center of Līvāni Municipality in the Latgale region of eastern Latvia. It is situated at the junction of the Dubna and Daugava rivers, approximately 170 kilometers east of the Latvian capital Riga.

Līvāni Municipality is the first municipality in Latgale region coming into Līvāni from the direction of Riga. Līvāni is a city where the Dubna meets the Daugava, Zemgale meets Latgale and roads go to Riga and Daugavpils, to Russia, Belarus and Lithuania. Since 2007, Līvāni city is a regional development centre where resources of development, social and economic activities are concentrated. Historical heritage of Līvāni city is being preserved in the character and structure of town planning. Spruce city public center on the Riga Street has obtained technocratic charm that expresses itself through the design of street commodities, renovated buildings and bikeways.

== History ==
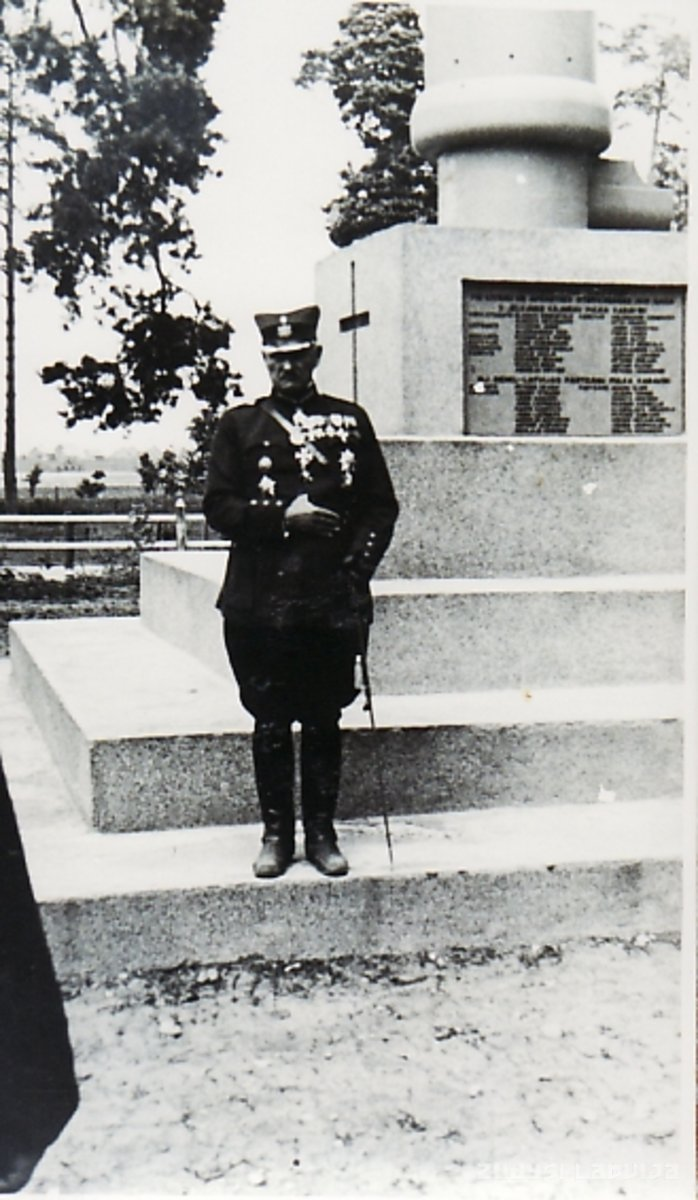
General of the Latvian Army near the Liberation Monument in Līvāni in 1935

Origins of Līvāni as a bigger place of population are linked to the 1533, when the then owner of the land Lieven established the manor and called it after his own name Lievenhof. The 1678, the first Catholic Church was built here. The city suffered considerably during the two world wars. Name of Līvāni is associated with the glass. In 1887 a glass factory was founded here, which today has ceased operation.

It was as early as in the 11th century, when settlement of traders and craftsmen was established at the current location of Līvāni. The settlement belonged to the old Latgallian city-state of Jersika - it was just 7 kilometres north of the centre of Jersika state, at the place where the then significant waterways of Dubna and Daugava meet. The first documentary evidence of a fortified settlement called Dubna dates back to a later period, 1289. The beginnings of Līvāni as we know it today are related to 1533, when the local German landlord Lieven founded here a hamlet and named it after himself - Lievenhof. In 1677, Līvāni were transferred into the ownership of the Polish magnate Leonard Pociej. Being a Catholic Christian, in 1678 he built the first Catholic church. The church stood on the riverbank of Dubna, close to the current location of Līvāni high school No.1 In those days, many beggars used to gather around the church. They used to take the food that was given to them to the riverbank of Dubna, beyond the road, there they had their meal. For that reason, the place got named "Beggar Bay" (Ubaglīcis). Nowadays it is an attractive residential area.

In 1824, Līvāni was granted the legal status of a borough ("miests"). It was this place where the second folk-school in Latgale was established in the year 1854. Another important event was opening of the first local pharmacy in 1689. When Latvia became an independent state, the development of Līvāni was fostered by the newly acquired legal status of a town (1926). Some 370 dwelling houses (most of them - wooden buildings) were built in a compact set along the main street of Līvāni, Rīgas iela. This street was famous for a wide range of small shops most of them owned by the local Jews. In the mid 1930s, there were around 180 shops in Līvāni. The town also played the role of the regional centre of culture.

== Industrial history ==
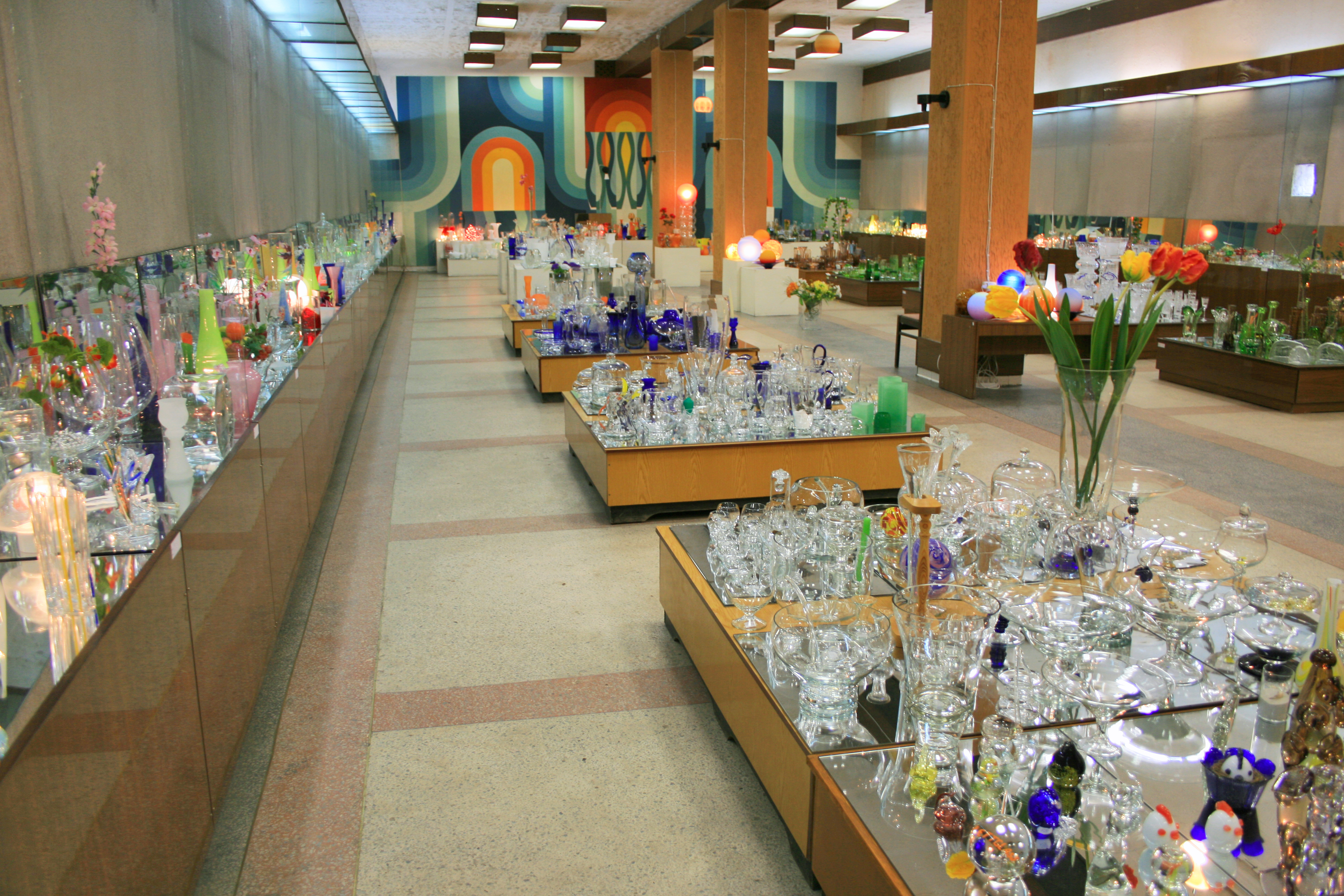
Museum of Līvāni Glass Factory

Industry has been the basis for development of Līvāni for almost two centuries. The local economy experienced a strong boost soon as the result of the opening of Riga - Orel railroad in 1861 and the drastic reforms of the 1860s, i.e. the abolishment of serfdom. The industrial growth was stimulated by the good traffic connections both via roads and waterways, the cheap labour coming from Vidzeme and Kurzeme regions as well as the rich local natural resources. For production purposes, it was possible to use woods available in the closest neighbourhood of Līvāni, besides additional wood supplies were brought by Dubna and Daugava rivers. Huge reserves of clay, dolomite, sand and peat were available there thus ensuring raw materials for production of construction materials, glass and peat. Until the early 1920s, 10 new factories were built in Līvāni; the biggest of them were pulp plant (established in 1872), glass factory (1887), wood-processing plant, and facilities for production of linoleum, bricks and textile products. In Meņķi, which is on the left riverbank of Daugava opposite to Līvāni, a French company built a horn factory, which produced buttons for corselets, hats and telephones and was the only of its kind in the entire Europe.

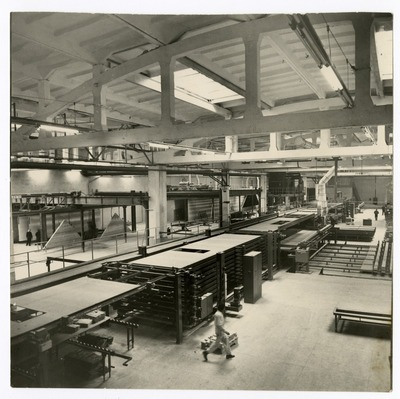
Experimental house building complex in Līvāni in 1979

During the World War I, the local factories were closed and their equipment was evacuated to Russia. For two and a half years, Līvāni remained in the front-line zone. Constant shooting was the reason for destruction of some 155 buildings. After the war, there were only 1880 inhabitants in Līvāni.

The business ceased to flourish in Līvāni along the advent of the World War II that left a half of the town in ruins. The Soviet occupation was not encouraging either; the old buildings and scenery on the riverbanks of Dubna and Daugava were gradually spoiled. In the 1970s, standardised 5-storey buildings were built instead of the dwelling houses demolished in the southern part of the town. That coincided with the establishment of huge industrial facilities in Līvāni. In the 1970s and 1980s a new biochemical plant, a production site for constructional materials and a building company were created there. The latter was specialised in building the so-called "Līvāni houses", which were very popular in the 1980s. The oldest industrial site in the town, the glass factory was extended. Līvāni became the third industrial centre of Latgale, next after second largest city of Latgale - Daugavpils and Rēzekne.

== Spatial organisation of Līvāni town ==
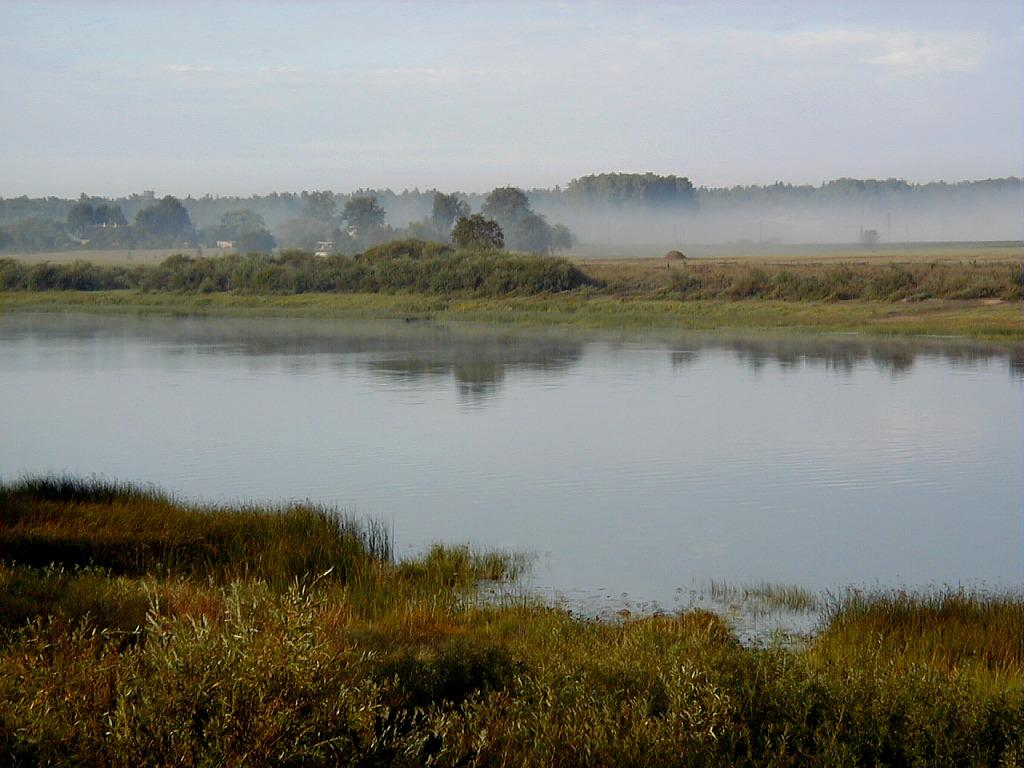
Daugava River near Līvāni

Līvāni is a typical example of the so-called linear towns. Such structure has been determined by its location on the riverbank of Daugava, on both sides of the motorway/rail road Rīga - Daugavpils. This transit route is, at the same time, the central street of Līvāni (Rīgas iela), and the central axis for planning building activities. The "centre" of the town, where the most important service providers ar located, is spread in length along the main street and its closest proximity. Thus, the town has a single centre, however, it has no exact borderlines.

Līvāni is crossed by two main roads, national highway A6 Rīga - Daugavpils and motorway P63 Līvāni - Preiļi. In 2003, reconstruction works were carried out for the bridge over Dubna river and Riga street, which now are in a good condition. In addition, the street lighting system on Līvāni streets has been significantly improved over the last years.

Total length of roads and streets in Līvāni is 38,5 km. Some 84% of all roads in the town are covered with bituminous concrete; the other roads are covered by broken stones. Feedback gathered from the local business people indicates that they find maintenance of municipal roads, in particular grading, replacement of damaged segments of concrete cover and snow removal during winter season, satisfactory.

The town is also crossed by a 4,8 km long railway segment. Total area covered by rail tracks is very impressive, they account for 5% of the total area of Līvāni. The local rail station is managing transit movement of cargoes and passengers, transportation services to the industrial enterprises in the town and the district. There are five rail tracks in the territory of the train station, including one main railroad and twenty switchpoints. Total length of rail tracks at the station is 2,500 meters. The local railroads are getting overloaded during the last years : daily throughput of Līvāni station is 48 cargo trains and 12 passenger trains. In order to solve road-crossing problems caused by the increasing traffic density, Līvāni District Council is planning to build a two-level rail crossing there.

During summer season, the two riverbanks of Daugava are connected by a ferry Līvāni - Dignāja, the straightest way from Latgale to Zemgale (in particular its sub-region Sēlija). This ferry is an important means of transportation for the people living on both sides of Daugava, both for pedestrians, car drivers and cyclists.

== Gallery ==
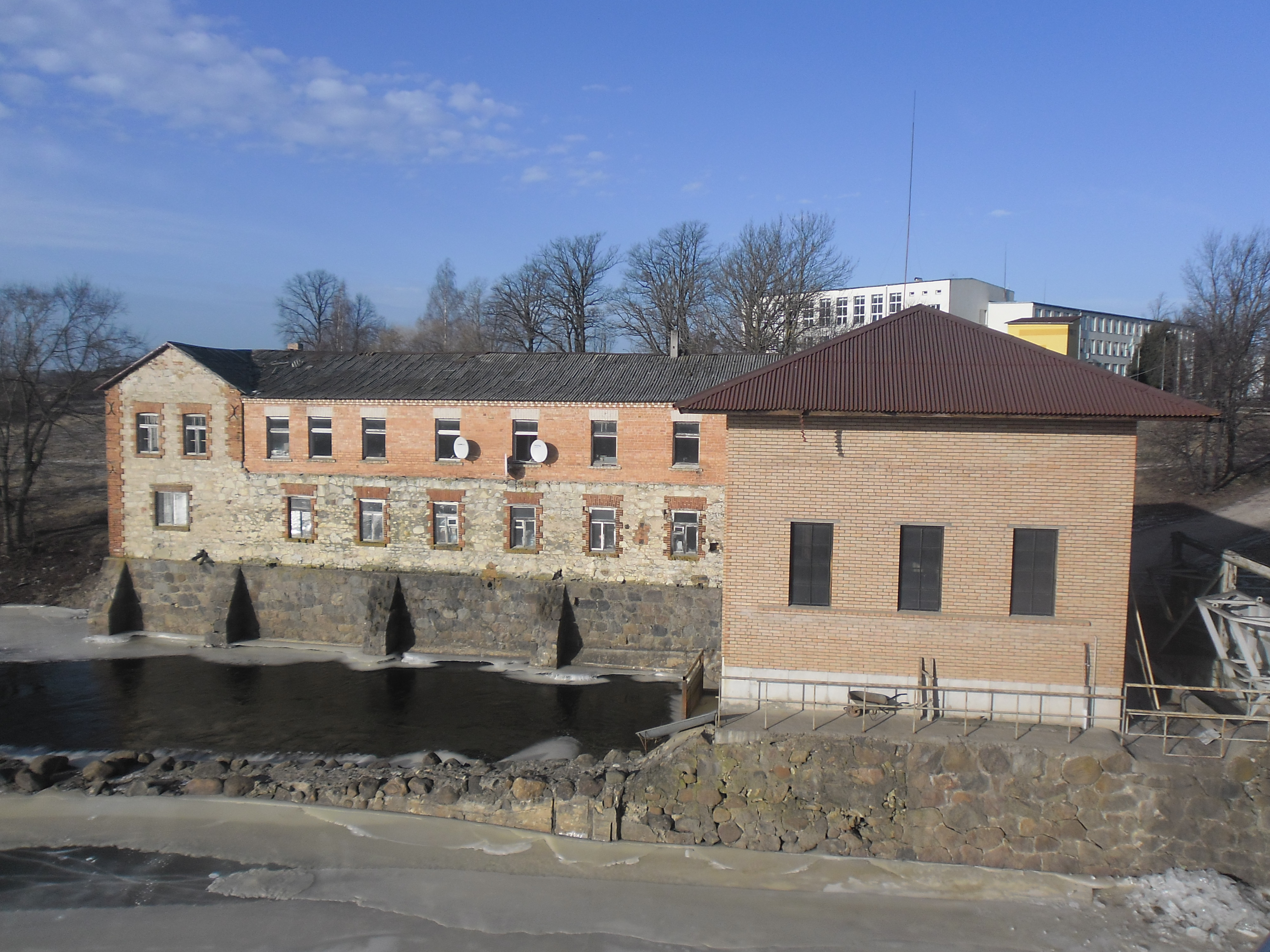
Water mill on the Dubna river

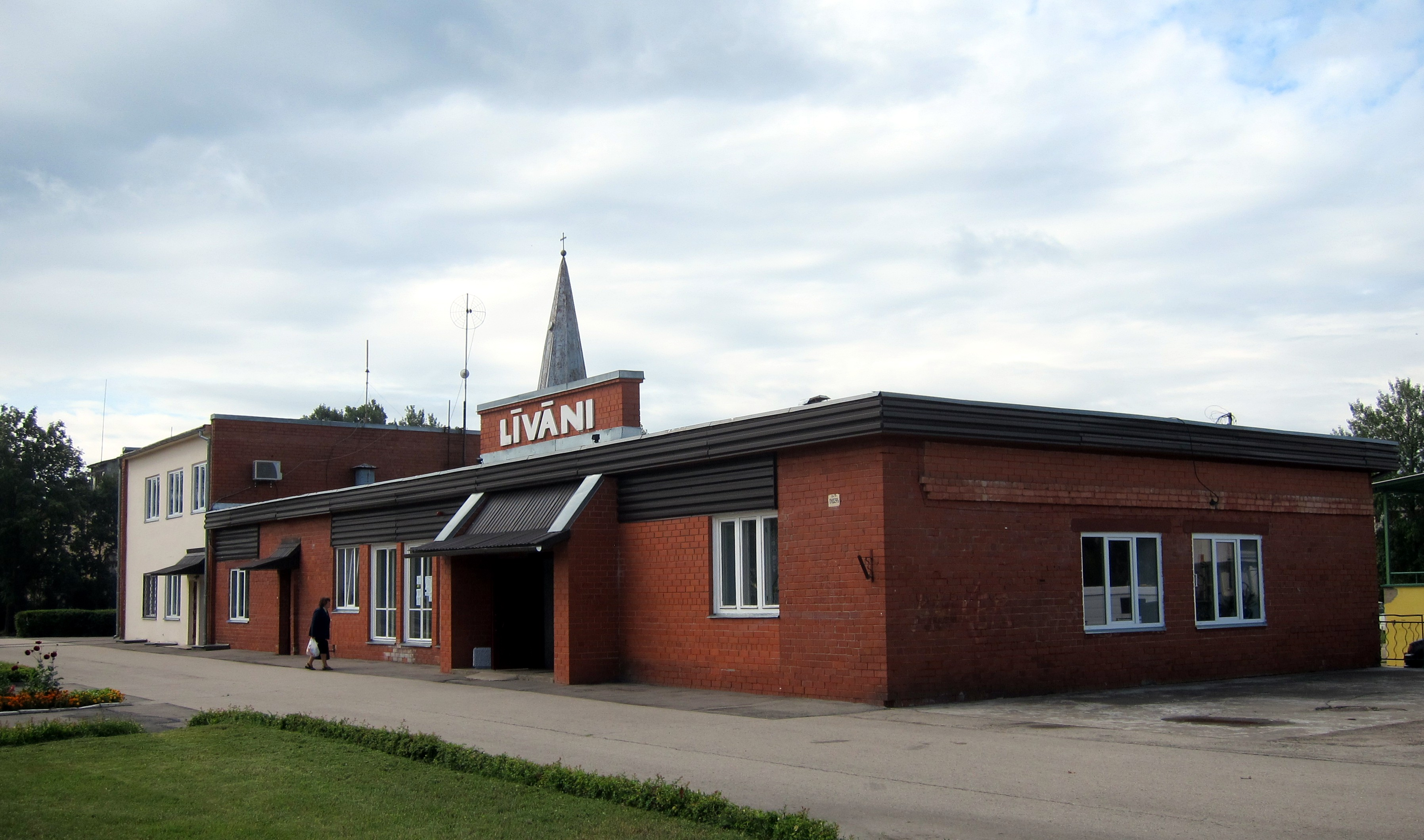
Līvāni Railway Station

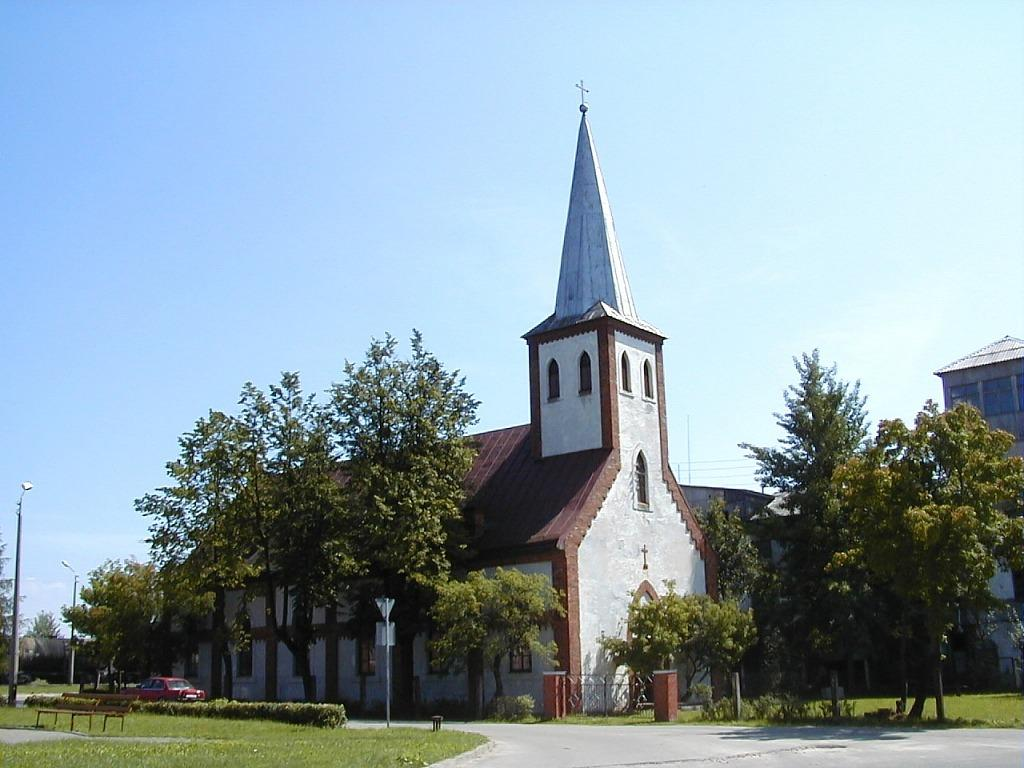
Līvāni Lutheran Church

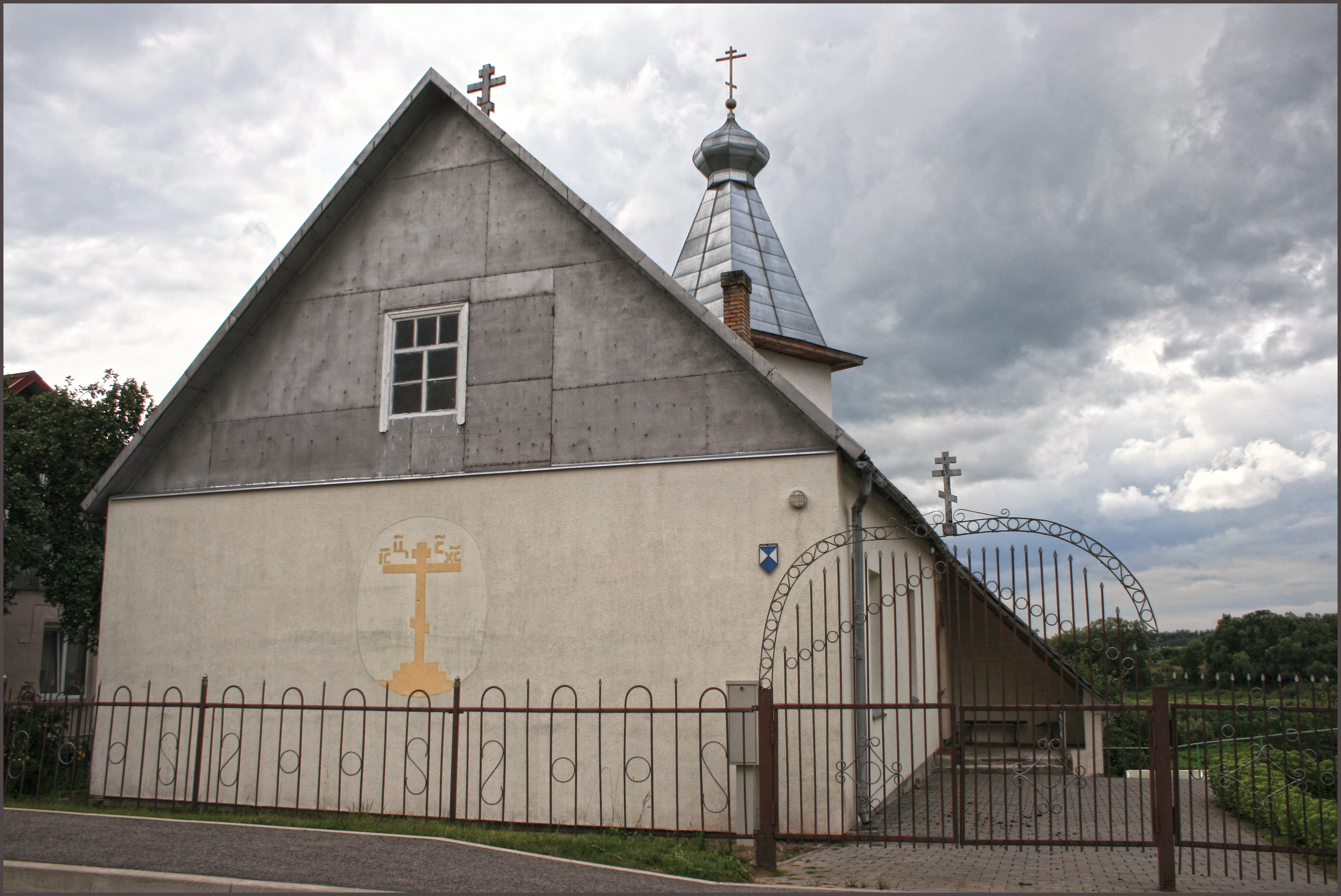
Old believers church in Līvāni

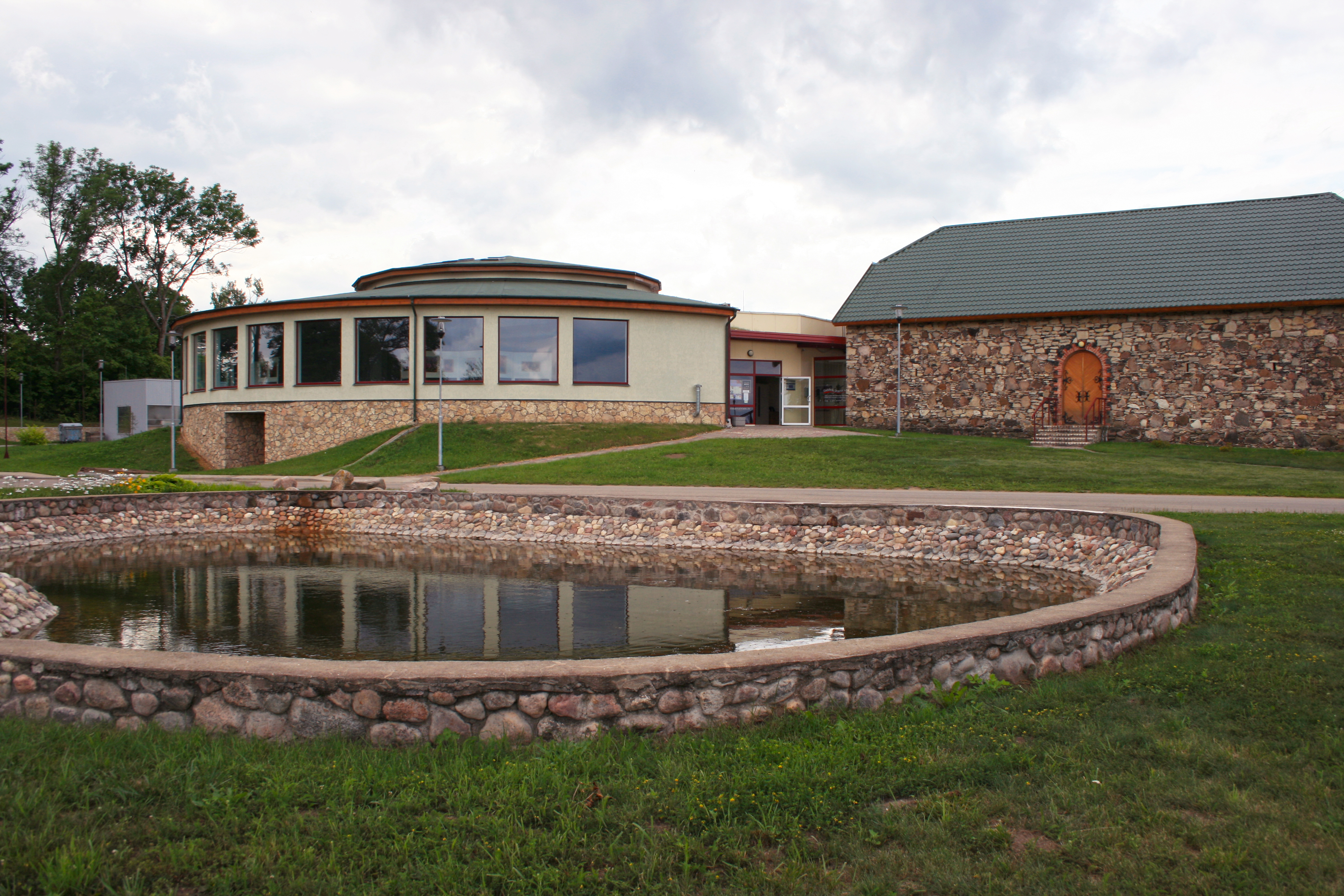
Latgale Art and Craft Centre

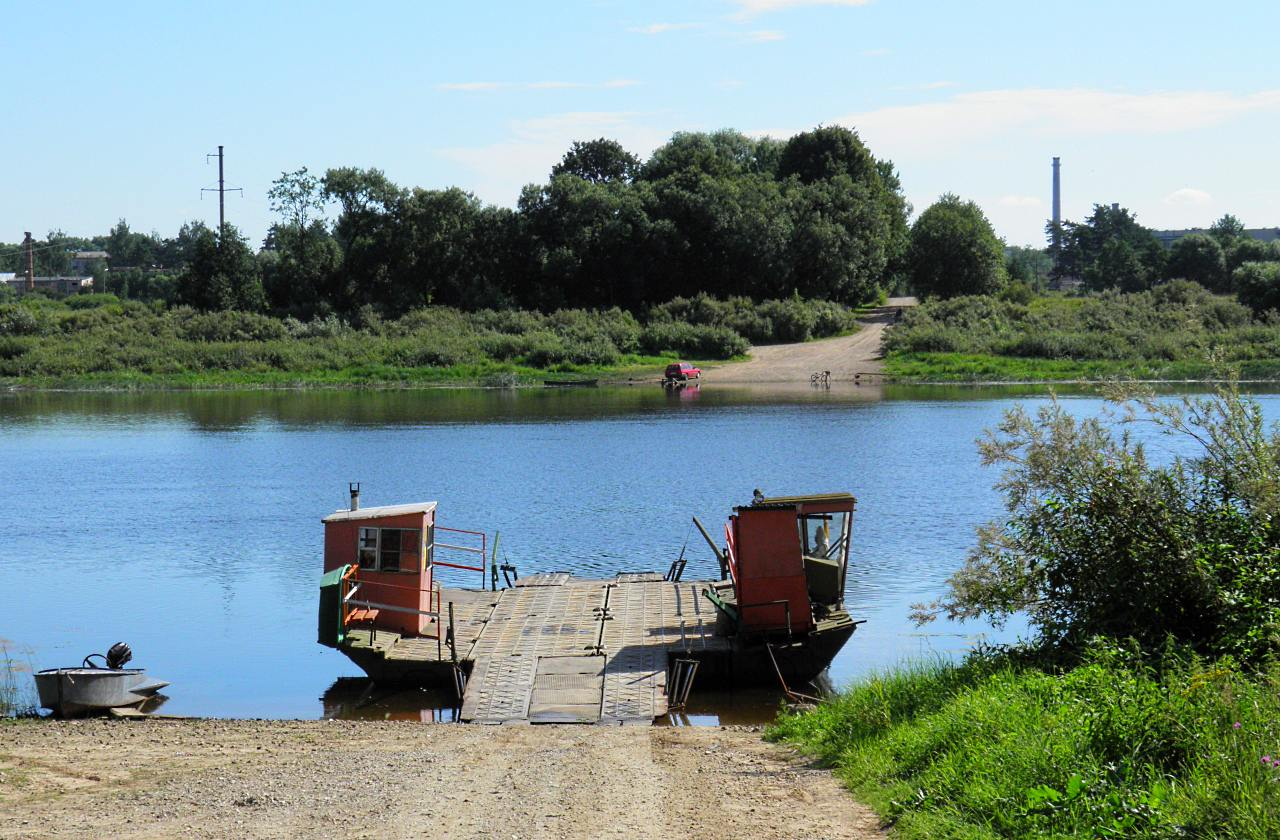
Ferry over Daugava near Līvāni
