= Sparganium gramineum =

Scientific classification
- Kingdom: Plantae
- Clade: Embryophytes
- Clade: Tracheophytes
- Clade: Spermatophytes
- Clade: Angiosperms
- Clade: Monocots
- Clade: Commelinids
- Order: Poales
- Family: Typhaceae
- Genus: Sparganium
- Species: S. gramineum

Binomial name
- Sparganium gramineum Georgi

Species of flowering plant

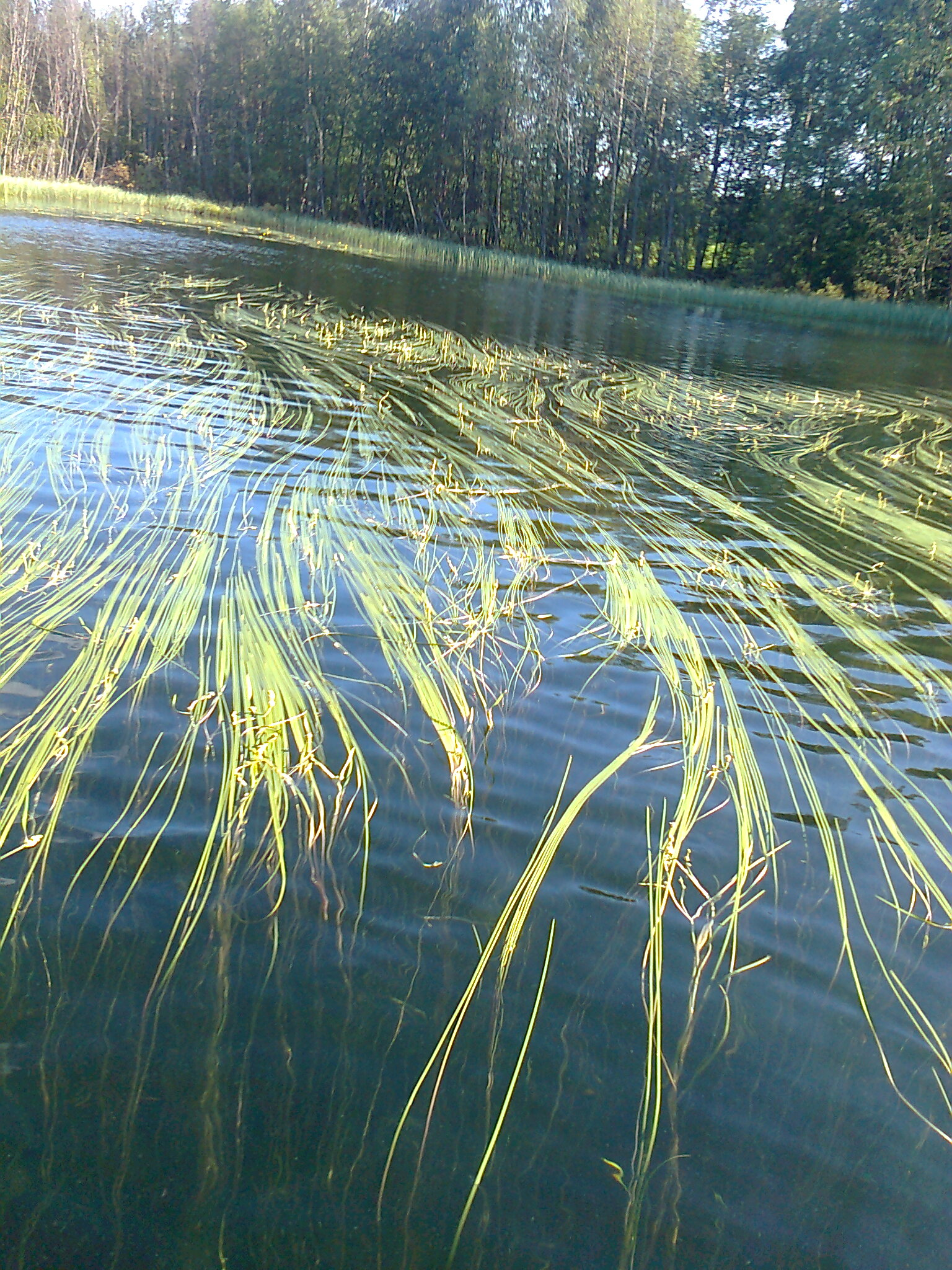

Sparganium gramineum is a species of flowering plant belonging to the family Typhaceae.

Its native range is Norway to Japan.
