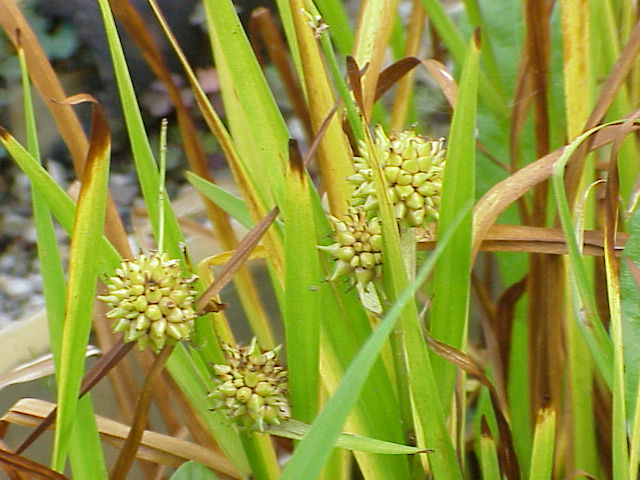
- Simplestem bur-reed (Sparganium erectum)

Scientific classification
- Kingdom: Plantae
- Clade: Tracheophytes
- Clade: Angiosperms
- Clade: Monocots
- Clade: Commelinids
- Order: Poales
- Family: Typhaceae
- Genus: Sparganium; L.

Synonyms
- Platanaria Gray

= Sparganium =

Genus of flowering plants

Sparganium eurycarpum

Sparganium (bur-reed) is a genus of flowering plants, described as a genus by Linnaeus in 1753. It is widespread in wet areas in temperate regions of both the Northern and Southern Hemispheres. The plants are perennial marsh plants that can grow to 3.5 m (11 ft), depending on the species, with epicene flowers.

It was previously placed alone in the family Sparganiaceae. Sparganium is closely related to the Typhaceae and the APG III system (2009) includes Sparganium in that family. It has been determined from phylogenetic analysis to be the closest living relative of the genus Typha (cat-tail).

== Summary ==
Sparganium, commonly known as the bur-reed, is a genus of aquatic plants of shallow marshes, ponds, and streams. There are 9 species found in the United States and Canada. The stem, which may be floating or emergent, emerges from a buried rhizome, which like many wetland plants, is dependent upon aerenchyma to transport oxygen to the rooting zone. The leaves are strap-like. The flowers are borne in spherical heads, which bear either male or female flowers. The seeds may accumulate in the soil as dense seed banks, which allow the plants to regenerate during low water periods.

Sparganium is an important component of aquatic and marsh vegetation in temperate to arctic regions. It provides food and cover for wildlife and waterfowl.

The genus name Sparganium was published by Linnaeus in Species Plantarum (1753), with two species recognized: S. erectum and S. natans.

Perhaps the first mention of Sparganium in the English language was made by William Turner (1562). Turner noted that there was no name for the plants in English, and suggested bede sedge or knop sedge. Further, he noted, "the virtues of Sparganium: The roote is good to be geven wyth wyne agaynste the poyson of serpentes."

== Taxonomy ==
Species

- Sparganium americanum – eastern North America
- Sparganium androcladum – eastern North America
- Sparganium angustifolium – Europe, Asia, North America
- Sparganium confertum – Yunnan
- Sparganium emersum – Europe, Asia, North America
- Sparganium × englerianum – Germany
- Sparganium erectum – Europe, Asia, North America
- Sparganium eurycarpum – Russian Far East, Japan, North America
- Sparganium fallax – East Asia, Himalayas, Sumatra, New Guinea
- Sparganium fluctuans – Canada, northern United States (New England, NY PA NJ MI WI MN WA)
- Sparganium glomeratum – Scandinavia, Baltics, Belarus, Russia, China, Mongolia, Japan, Canada, Minnesota, Wisconsin
- Sparganium gramineum – Scandinavia, Baltics, Russia, Japan
- Sparganium hyperboreum – Alps, Subarctic (Europe, Russia, Alaska, Canada, Greenland)
- Sparganium japonicum – Primorye, Japan, Korea
- Sparganium kawakamii – Sakhalin, Kuril Islands
- Sparganium limosum – Yunnan
- Sparganium × longifolium – northern Russia
- Sparganium natans – Europe, Asia, North America
- Sparganium × oligocarpon – Siberia
- Sparganium probatovae – Kamchatka
- Sparganium rothertii – Siberia, Manchuria, Japan
- Sparganium × speirocephalum – Finland
- Sparganium × splendens – western Russia
- Sparganium stoloniferum – temperate Asia
- Sparganium subglobosum – East Asia, Himalayas, New Guinea, Australia, New Zealand
- Sparganium yunnanense – Yunnan

== Fossil record ==
Many fossil endocarps and a few seeds of †Sparganium pusilloides have been described from middle Miocene strata of the Fasterholt area near Silkeborg in Central Jutland, Denmark. Otherwise the species has been recorded from the Middle Oligocene to the Middle Miocene floras of Central Europe, among these from the Middle Oligocene Haselbacher See clay in Leipzig. Fossils of 20 endocarps of †Sparganium simplex and 1 endocarp of †Sparganium multiloculare have also been described from the Fasterholt area near Silkeborg in Central Jutland, S. multiloculare is also described from the Oligocene of southern England and the Oligocene and Miocene floras of Central Europe and Western Siberia. Sparganium is also recorded in Pliocene and Miocene floras of Arctic North America
