= Jersika Station =

Railway station in Latvia

Jersika
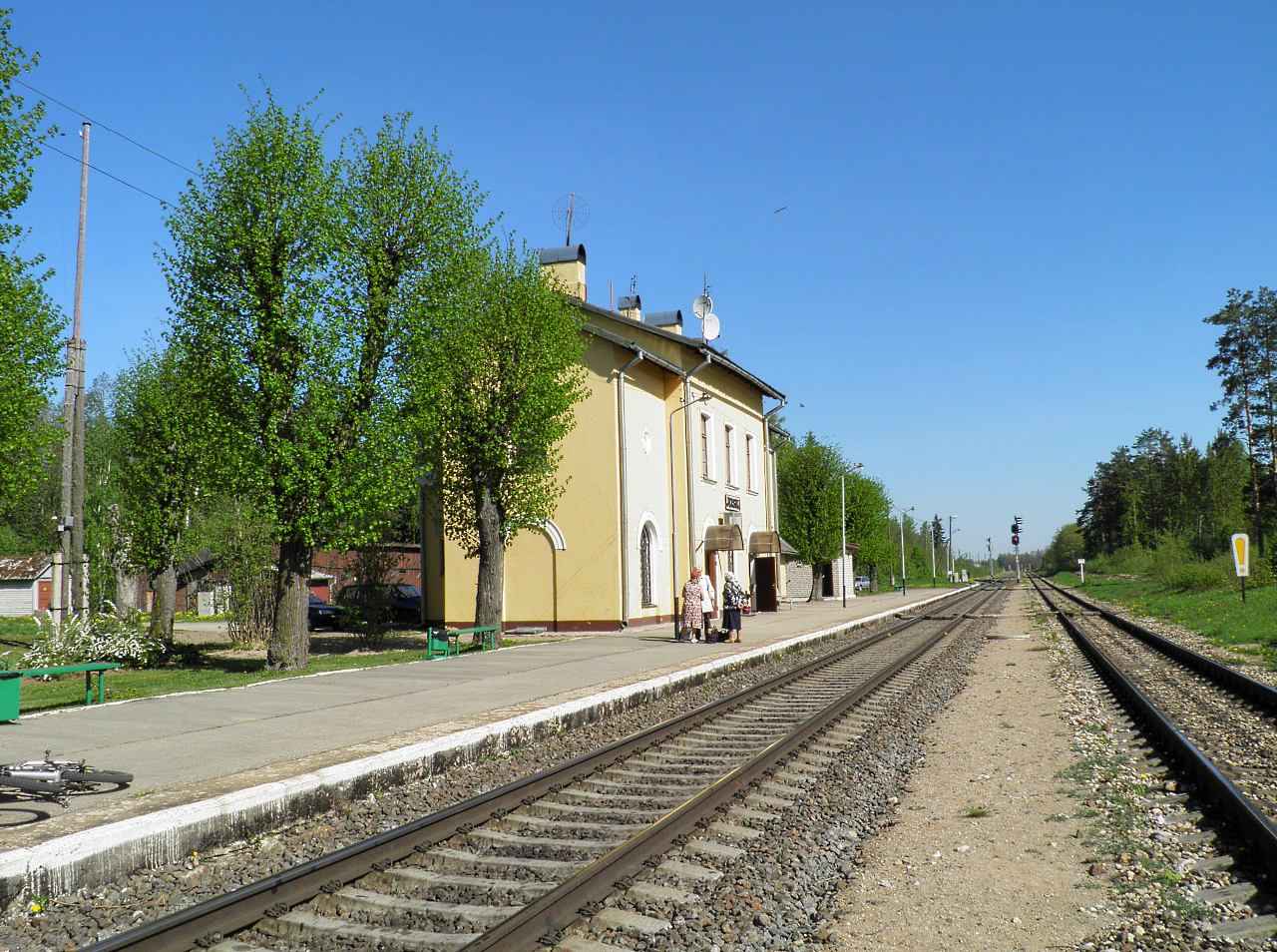
- Jersika railway station in 2011

General information
- Location: Jersika, Jersika Parish, Līvāni Municipality
- Coordinates: 56°15′17.02″N 26°12′38.17″E
- Platforms: 1
- Tracks: 2

History
- Opened: 1861
- Former names: Zargrad

Services
Preceding station	LDz	Following station
Līvāni towards Riga	Riga–Daugavpils	Nīcgale towards Daugavpils
Location
- Location within Latvia railways

Jersika Station is a railway station serving the settlement of Jersika in the Latgale region of south-eastern Latvia. It is located on the Riga–Daugavpils Railway.
