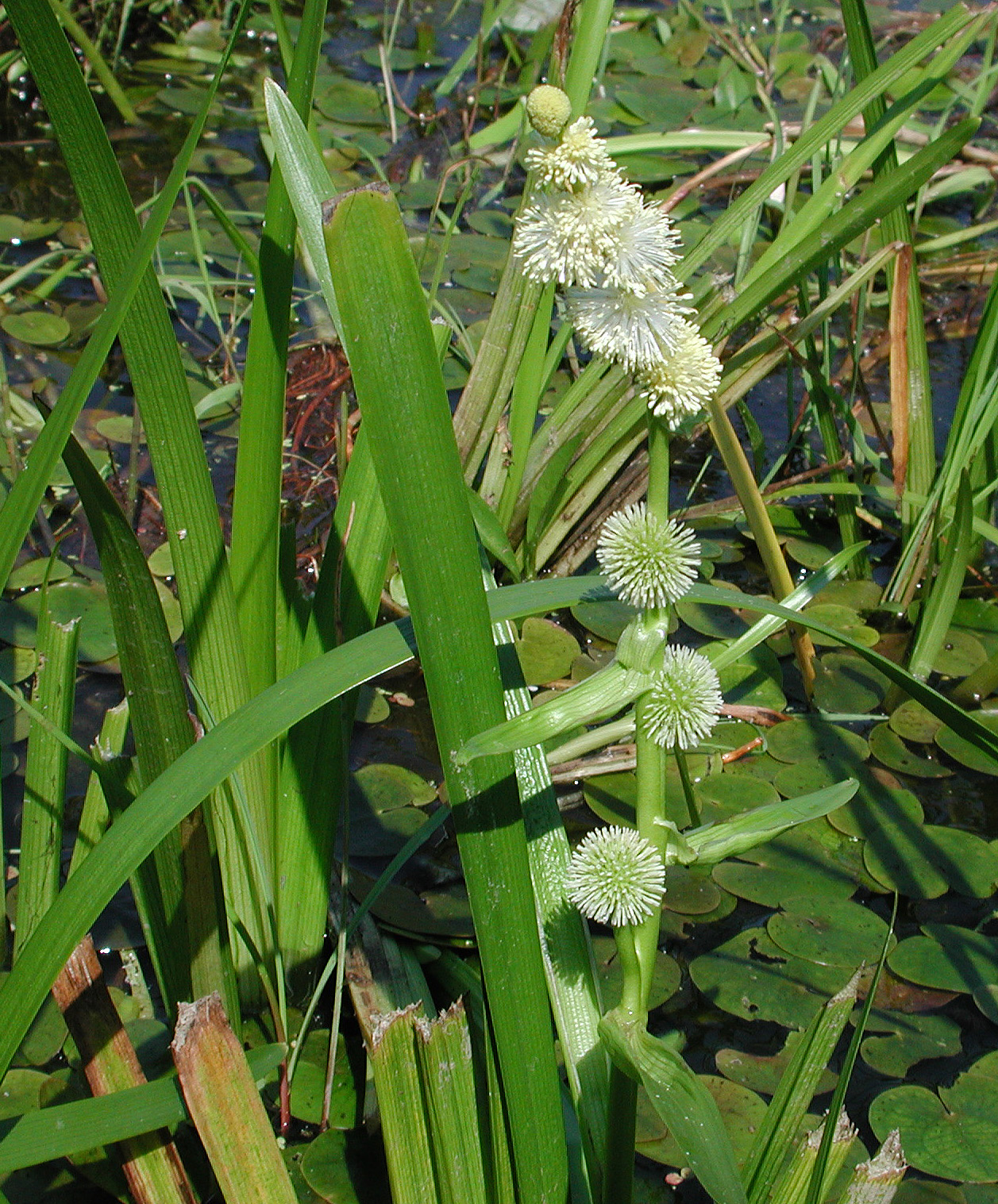

Conservation status
- Least Concern (IUCN 3.1)

Scientific classification
- Kingdom: Plantae
- Clade: Tracheophytes
- Clade: Angiosperms
- Clade: Monocots
- Clade: Commelinids
- Order: Poales
- Family: Typhaceae
- Genus: Sparganium
- Species: S. emersum

Binomial name
- Sparganium emersum Rehmann

Synonyms
- List: Sparganium acaule (Beeby ex Macoun) Rydb.; Sparganium angustifolium var. chlorocarpum (Rydb.) Brayshaw; Sparganium angustifolium subsp. emersum (Rehmann) Brayshaw; Sparganium angustifolium var. multipedunculatum (Morong) Brayshaw; Sparganium chlorocarpum Rydb.; Sparganium chlorocarpum var. acaule (Beeby ex Macoun) Fernald; Sparganium chlorocarpum f. acaule (Beeby ex Macoun) E.G.Voss; Sparganium chlorocarpum var. typicum R.T.Clausen; Sparganium diversifolium var. acaule (Beeby ex Macoun) Fernald & Eames; Sparganium emersum var. acaule (Beeby) A.Haines; Sparganium emersum subsp. acaule (Beeby ex Macoun) C.D.K.Cook & M.S.Nicholls; Sparganium emersum f. angustifolium (Morong) Soó; Sparganium emersum f. gracile (Meinsh.) Soó; Sparganium emersum var. multipedunculatum (Morong) Reveal; Sparganium emersum f. simile (Meinsh.) Soó; Sparganium emersum subsp. simplex (Huds.) Soó; Sparganium emersum f. submersum (Glück) Soó; Sparganium emersum f. subvaginatum (Meinsh.) Soó; Sparganium longissimum (Fr.) Fritsch; Sparganium multipedunculatum (Morong) Rydb.; Sparganium simile Meinsh.; Sparganium simplex Huds.; Sparganium simplex var. acaule Beeby; Sparganium simplex f. angustifolium C.L.Beckm.; Sparganium simplex var. multipedunculatum Morong; Sparganium subvaginatum Meinsh.; Sparganium wirtgeniorum (Graebn.) Rouy

= Sparganium emersum =

Species of flowering plant

Sparganium emersum is a species of flowering plant in the cat-tail family known by the common names European bur-reed and unbranched bur-reed. It has a circumboreal distribution, occurring throughout the northern latitudes of Eurasia and North America. It is an aquatic plant, growing in shallow water bodies such as ponds and streams. It can become abundant at times. It is a perennial herb producing a floating stem up to 2 meters long. The leaves may be limp and floating or stiff and erect, emerging above the water surface. The leaves are flat and straplike, sometimes with a triangular, keeled base that can help distinguish it from the similar Sparganium angustifolium. It is monoecious, individual plants bearing both male and female inflorescences. These are spherical, the male inflorescence a ball of stamens and the female inflorescence a ball of developing fruits growing beneath the male spheres.
