= Jelgava–Krustpils Railway =

Railway in Latvia

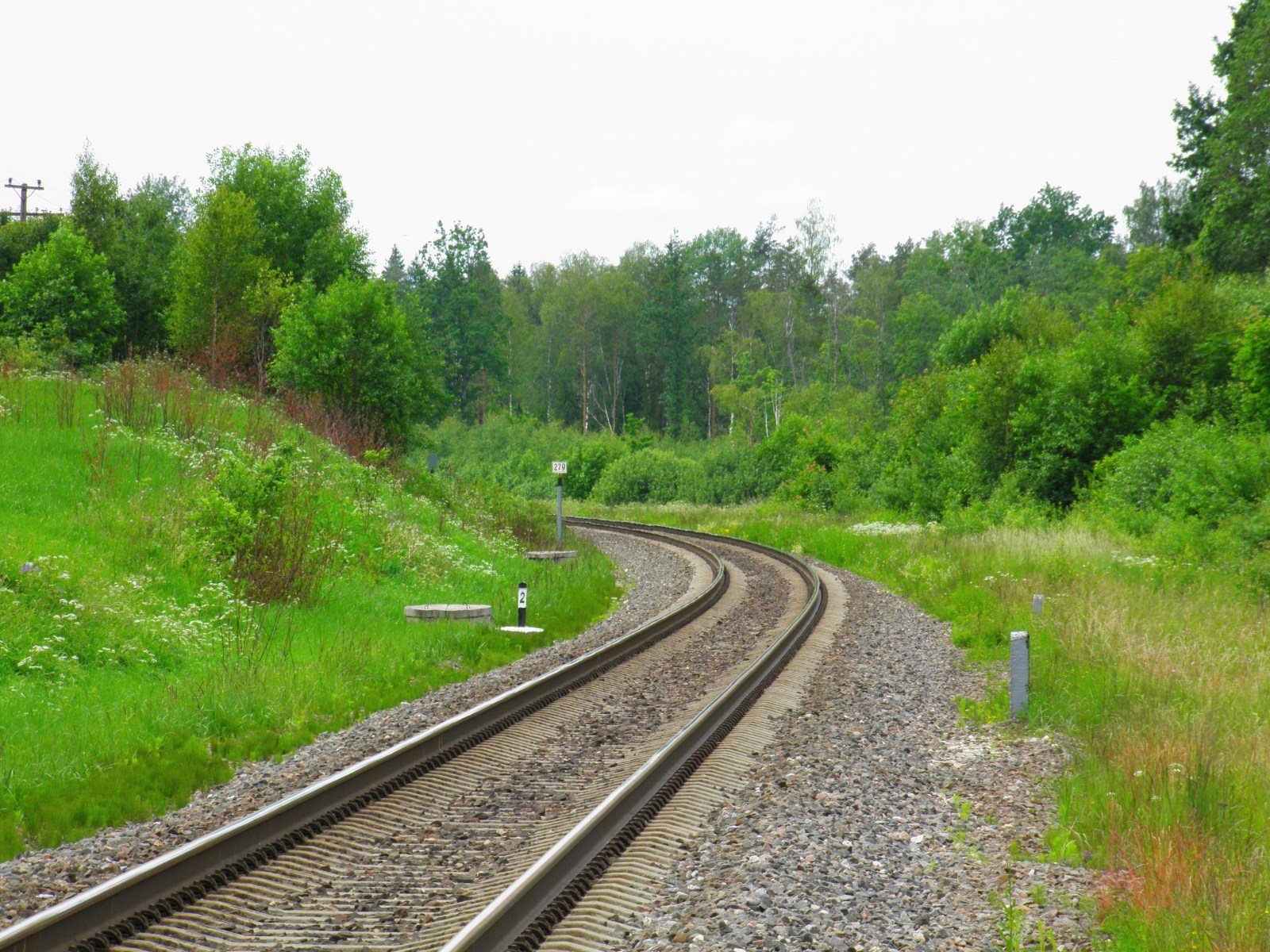

Overview
- Termini: Jelgava Station; Krustpils Station

Service
- Operator(s): Latvian Railways

History
- Opened: 1904

Technical
- Line length: 138 km (85.75 mi)
- Track gauge: 1,524 mm (5 ft)

Railway lines in Latvia in 2016.

The Jelgava–Krustpils Railway is a 138 kilometres (86 mi) long, 1,524 mm (5 ft) gauge railway built in the 19th century to connect Ventspils and Moscow.

== See also ==
- Rail transport in Latvia
- History of rail transport in Latvia

== Bibliography ==
- Altbergs, T.; Augustāne, K.; Pētersone, I. (2009). Dzelzceļi Latvijā [Railways in Latvia] (in Latvian). Jumava. ISBN 978-9984-38-698-0.
