= Orlestone Forest =

Woodland in Kent, England

Coordinates: 51.080°N 0.830°E

- Site of Special Scientific Interest
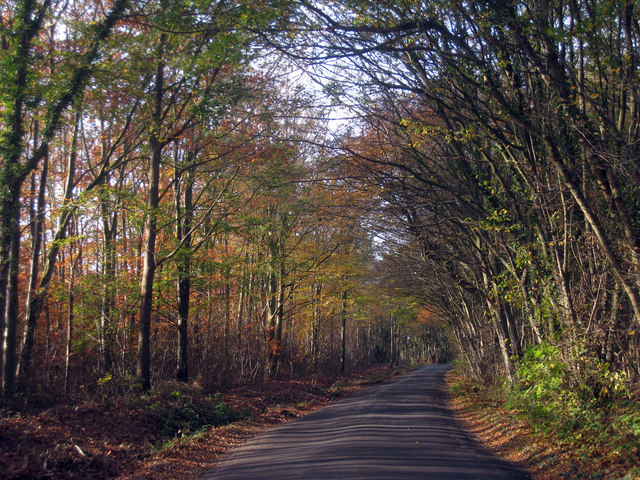
- Location of Orlestone Forest.
- Area of search: Kent
- Grid reference: TQ 983 350
- Interest: Biological
- Area: 347.6 hectares (859 acres)
- Notification date: 1989
- Location map: Magic Map

Orlestone Forest is a 347.6-hectare (859-acre) biological Site of Special Scientific Interest south of Ashford in Kent. It is a Nature Conservation Review site, Grade I.

This site is described by Natural England as "an important invertebrate locality of national significance". Hundreds of invertebrate species have been recorded, including 39 which are nationally rare and 134 which are nationally scarce. Several are only known in Britain on this site.

A road and footpath go through the site.
