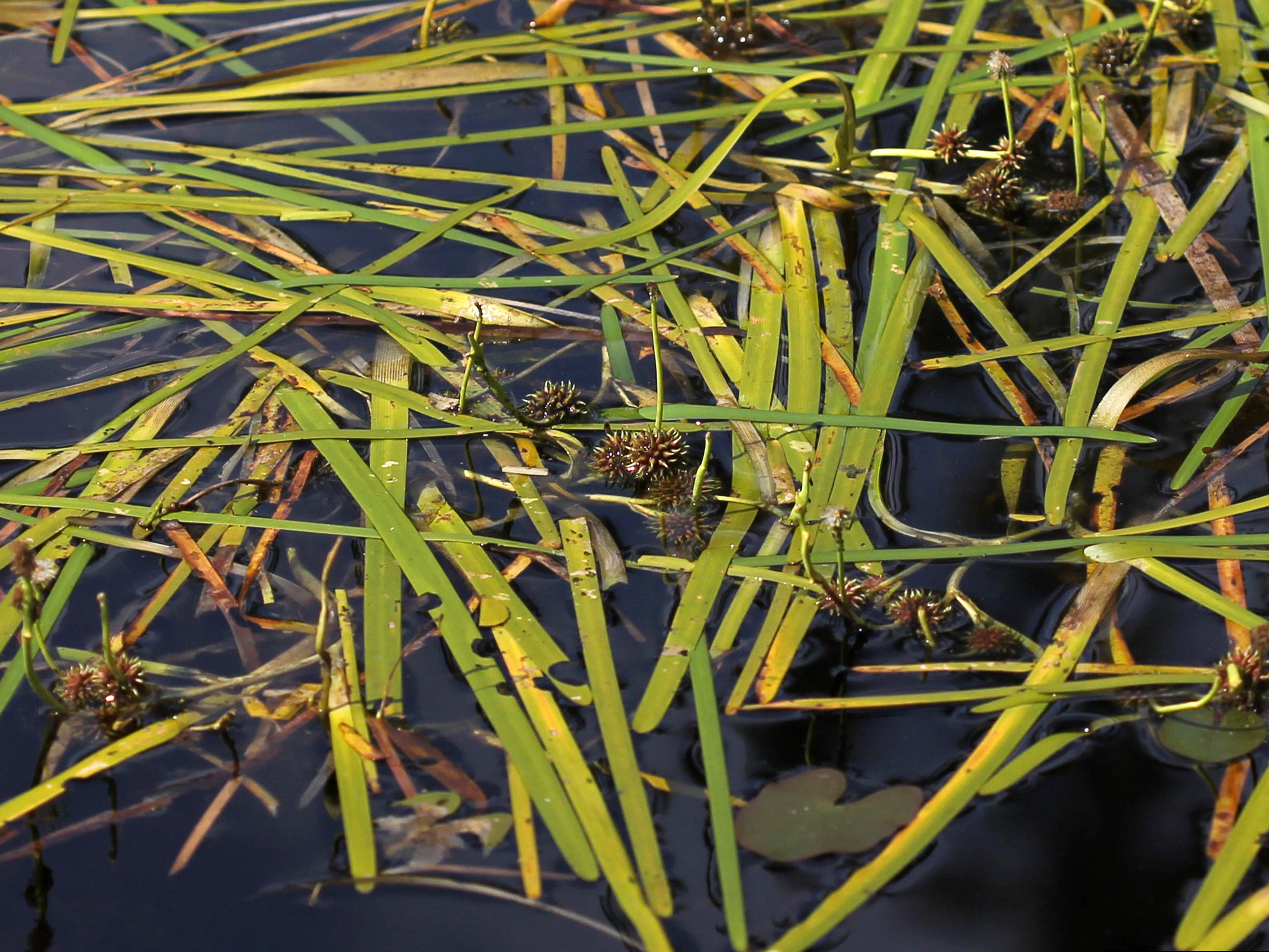

Conservation status
- Least Concern (IUCN 3.1)

Scientific classification
- Kingdom: Plantae
- Clade: Tracheophytes
- Clade: Angiosperms
- Clade: Monocots
- Clade: Commelinids
- Order: Poales
- Family: Typhaceae
- Genus: Sparganium
- Species: S. fluctuans

Binomial name
- Sparganium fluctuans (Engelm. ex Morong) B.L. Rob.

= Sparganium fluctuans =

Species of aquatic plant

Sparganium fluctuans is a species of bur-reed found in North America known by the common name floating bur-reed. It is listed as endangered in Connecticut.
