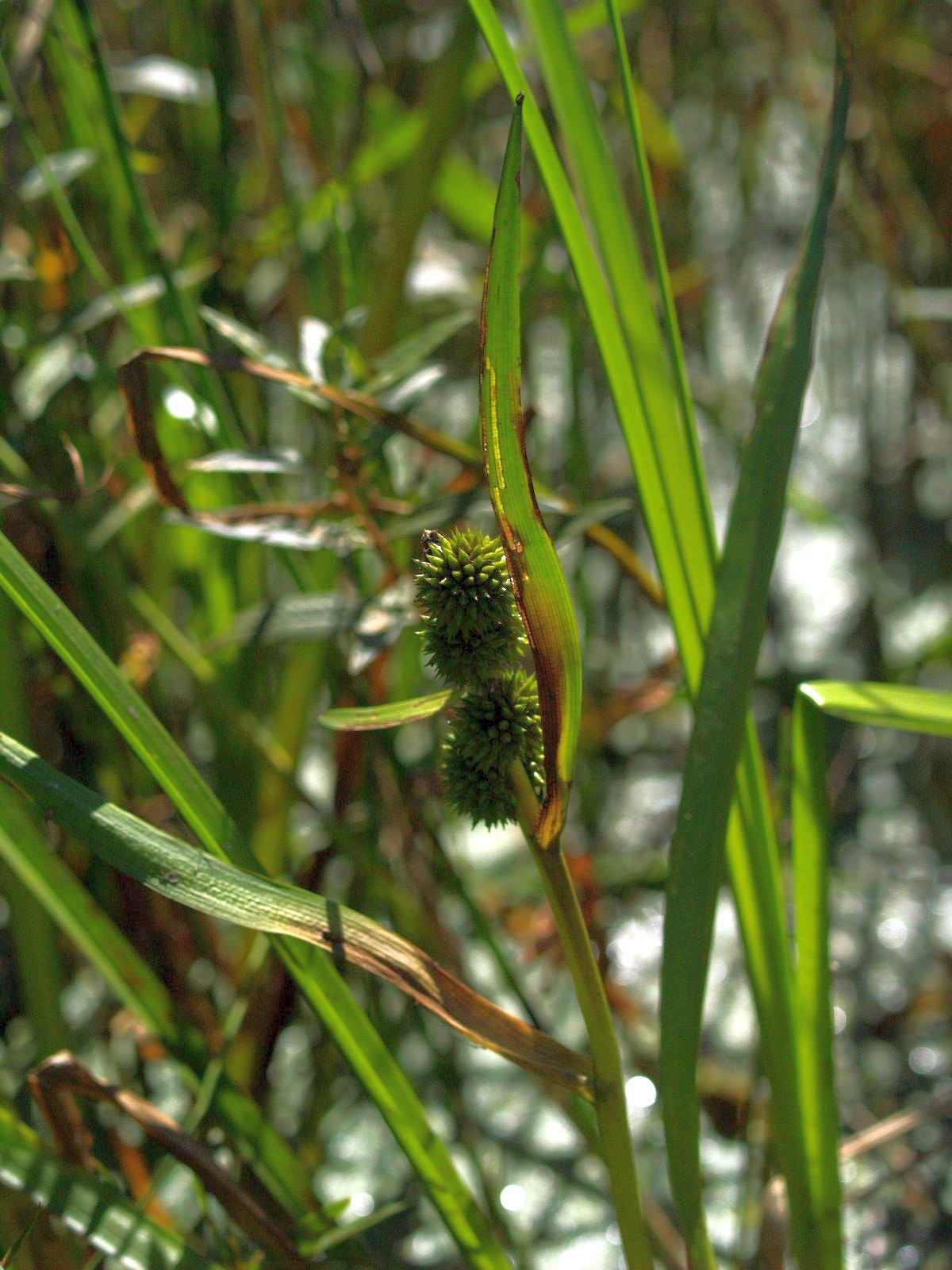

Conservation status
- Least Concern (IUCN 3.1)

Scientific classification
- Kingdom: Plantae
- Clade: Tracheophytes
- Clade: Angiosperms
- Clade: Monocots
- Clade: Commelinids
- Order: Poales
- Family: Typhaceae
- Genus: Sparganium
- Species: S. glomeratum

Binomial name
- Sparganium glomeratum Laest. ex Beurl., 1853

= Sparganium glomeratum =

Species of aquatic plant

Sparganium glomeratum, the clustered bur-reed, is a species of bur-reed. It is a water plant native to high elevation lakes and marshes of Europe, Asia, and North America. North American populations were doubted as introduced due to its scarce and scattered populations, but a recent herbarium survey found more localities of the species in the central of Canada, concluding the species as circumpolar species.
