= Nīcgale Parish =

Parish of Latvia

- parish of Latvia
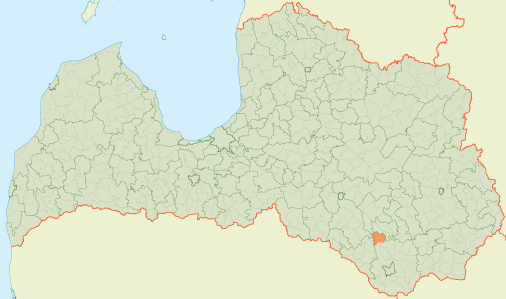
- 56°09′05″N 26°24′14″E

- Location within Latvia
- Country: Latvia

Area
  - Total: 96.62 km^{2} (37.31 sq mi)
  - Land: 91.46 km^{2} (35.31 sq mi)
  - Water: 5.16 km^{2} (1.99 sq mi)

Population (1 January 2026)
  - Total: 477
  - Density: 5.22/km^{2} (13.5/sq mi)
- Website: nicgale.lv

Nīcgale Parish (Latvian: Nīcgales pagasts; Latgalian: Neicgaļa pogosts) is an administrative unit of Augšdaugava Municipality in the Latgale region of Latvia.

== Towns, villages and settlements of Nīcgale Parish ==
- Nīcgale
