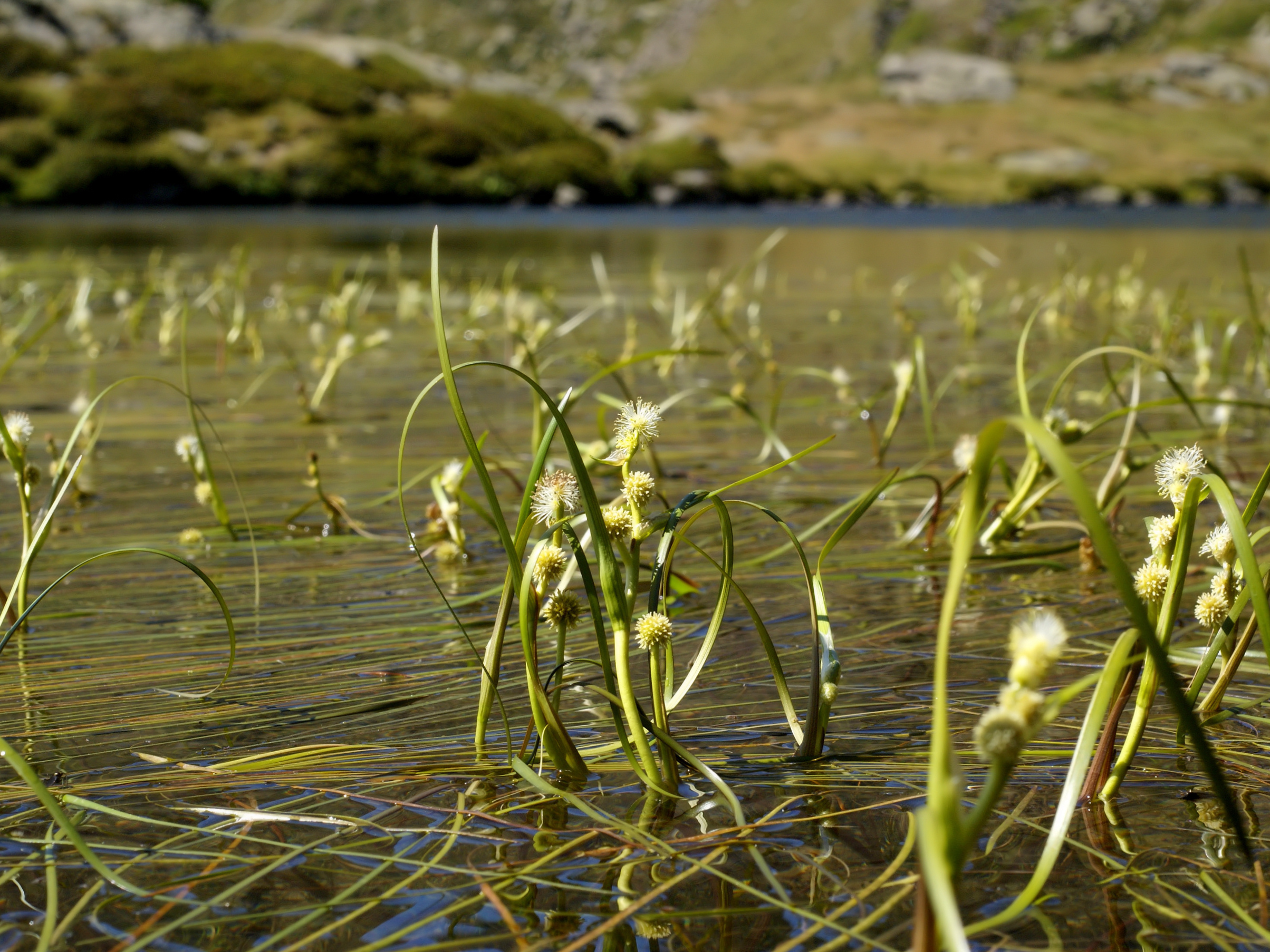

Conservation status
- Least Concern (IUCN 3.1)

Scientific classification
- Kingdom: Plantae
- Clade: Tracheophytes
- Clade: Angiosperms
- Clade: Monocots
- Clade: Commelinids
- Order: Poales
- Family: Typhaceae
- Genus: Sparganium
- Species: S. angustifolium

Binomial name
- Sparganium angustifolium Michx.

Synonyms
- List: Sparganium affine Schnizl.; Sparganium affine subsp. borderi (Focke) Weberb.; Sparganium borderi Focke; Sparganium boreale Laest. ex Beurl.; Sparganium emersum var. angustifolium (Michx.) Roy L.Taylor & MacBryde; Sparganium fluitans Fr.; Sparganium natans var. angustifolium (Michx.) Pursh; Sparganium simplex Muhl.; Sparganium simplex var. angustifolium (Michx.) Torr.; Sparganium vaginatum Larss.

= Sparganium angustifolium =

Species of flowering plant

Sparganium angustifolium is a species of flowering plant in the cat-tail family known by the common names floating bur-reed and narrowleaf bur-reed. It has a circumboreal distribution, occurring throughout the northern latitudes of the Northern Hemisphere. It is an aquatic plant, growing in water up to 2.5 meters deep. Its habitat includes acidic, low-nutrient freshwater bodies such as ponds, lakes, slow-moving streams, and ditches. It can become abundant, practically covering the surface of the water. It is a perennial herb producing a floating stem with long, narrow, flattened leaves which can be quite long, sometimes reaching over two meters. It is monoecious, individual plants bearing both male and female inflorescences. These are spherical, the male inflorescence a ball of stamens and the female inflorescence a ball of developing fruits.
