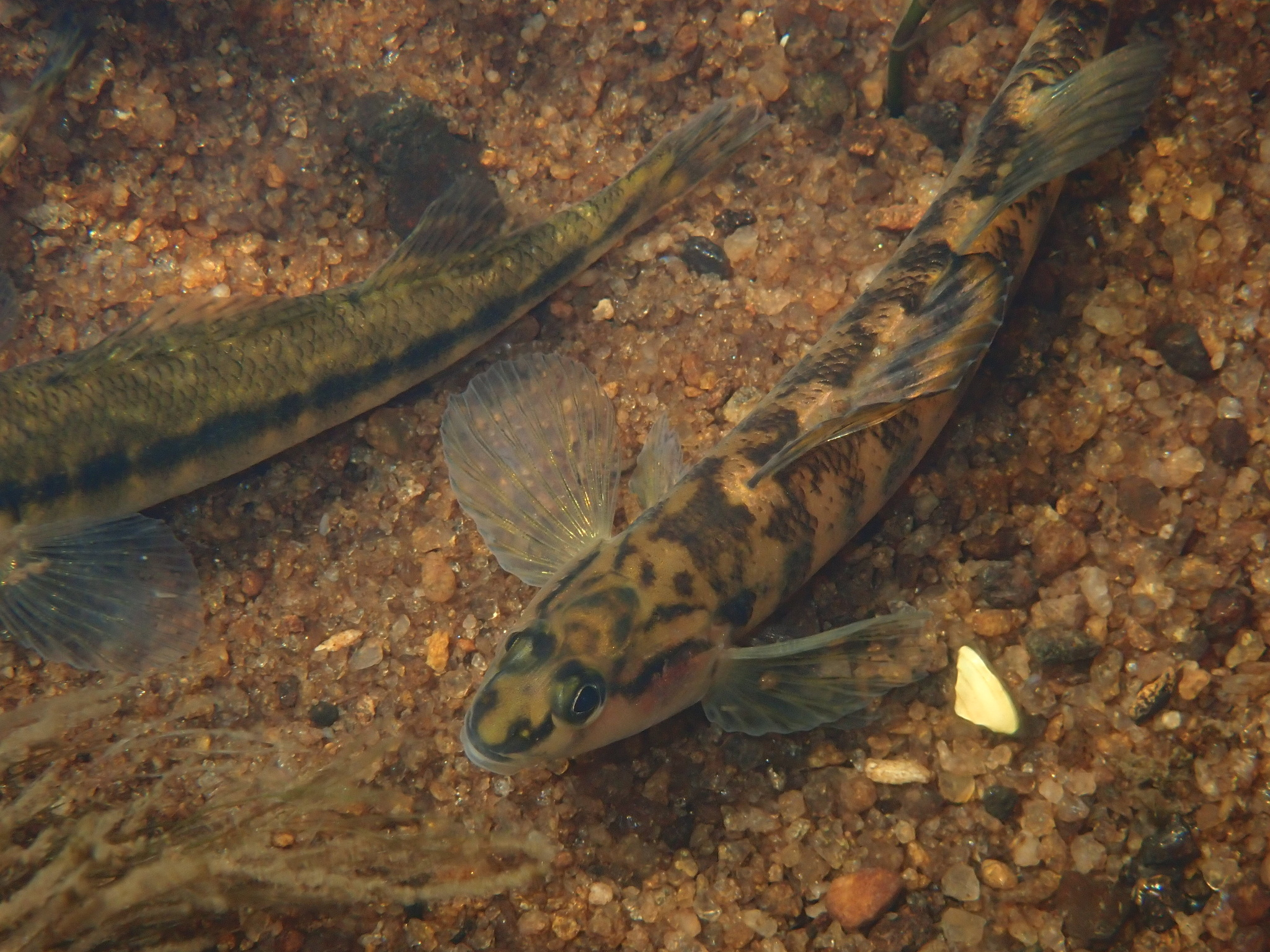

Conservation status
- Vulnerable (IUCN 3.1)

Scientific classification
- Kingdom: Animalia
- Phylum: Chordata
- Class: Actinopterygii
- Order: Perciformes
- Family: Percidae
- Genus: Percina
- Species: P. crypta

Binomial name
- Percina crypta M. C. Freeman, B. J. Freeman, Burkhead & Straight, 2008
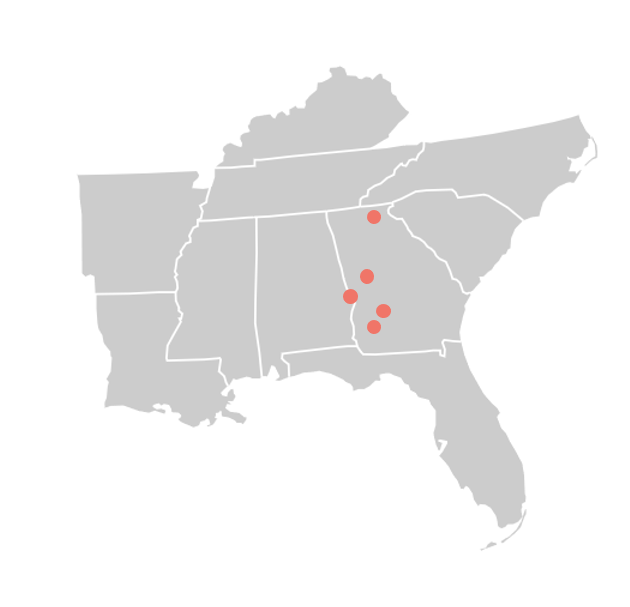

= Halloween darter =

Species of fish

The Halloween darter (Percina crypta) is a small freshwater fish native to North America. It is found in Georgia and Alabama in the drainage basin of the Apalachicola River, specifically in the Flint River system and the Chattahoochee River system. It prefers shallow, fast-flowing areas with gravel bottoms in small and medium-sized rivers. It was first described in 2008, having not previously been distinguished from the Blackbanded darter (P. nigrofasciata), formerly thought to occur in the same watershed. Blackbanded darter has since been split again with Westfall's darter now recognised from the Apalachicola drainage. The species is somewhat variable, being generally blackish dorsally, with some individuals having indistinct saddle-like barring. Males have orange and dark lateral striping while females have dark stripes and a yellowish-green belly. At a maximum standard length of 101 mm (4 in), males are slightly larger than females, and both sexes develop distinctive orange barring on the edge of the first dorsal fin during the breeding season.

The Halloween darter has a limited range and a fragmented distribution. The main threat faced by the species is a deterioration in the quality of its habitat. It has been classified as a "vulnerable species" by the International Union for Conservation of Nature. It has been listed as "threatened" in Georgia by the Georgia Department of Natural Resources, and is protected in Alabama under the Nongame Species Regulation of the Alabama Department of Conservation and Natural Resources.

== Taxonomy ==
The Halloween darter was described as a new species in 2008 by Mary C. Freeman, Byron J. Freeman, and Noel M. Burkhead. The holotype had been collected in 1994 by B. J. Freeman, J. Devivo, J. W. Garrett, M. J. Zieg, R. E. Jenkins, J. S. Boyce, L. M. Hartle, and M. Flood from the Chattahoochee River near Sautee Nacoochee, Georgia and Nora Mill Dam. The species name crypta is from the Greek root crypt, meaning "hidden" or "concealed". The authors chose this name to reference how the Halloween darter's existence as a separate species was concealed by its similar appearance to the blackbanded darter (P. nigrofasciata); prior to the Halloween darter's description, it was thought that the blackbanded darter was the only species of Percina found in the area of the Apalachicola River. blackbanded darter is now known not to be present in the system at all, after being split again, Percina westfalli is now known to be sympatric with P. crypta. The common name "Halloween darter" was chosen to allude to the orange and black breeding coloration of individuals, as these colors are associated with the Western holiday Halloween.

Based on nuclear and mitochondrial DNA, the Halloween darter and blackbanded darter form a clade with nine other members of Percina, identified as the subgenus Hadropterus. The other members of Hadropterus are the Guadalupe darter (P. apristis), the goldline darter (P. aurolineata), the dusky darter (P. sciera), the bronze darter (P. palmaris), the bridled darter (P. kusha), the muscadine darter (P. smithvanizi), the Bankhead darter (P. sipsi), the freckled darter (P. lenticula), and Westfall's darter (P. westfalli). The clade is a polytomy, however, meaning that clearer evolutionary relationships among members was not discernible based on the utilized methods. A 2018 study found no genetic distinction between the Halloween darter and Westfall's darter in the Chattahoochee and Flint Rivers. The latter, described in 1942 from Florida, is sometimes considered a subspecies of the blackbanded darter.

== Description ==
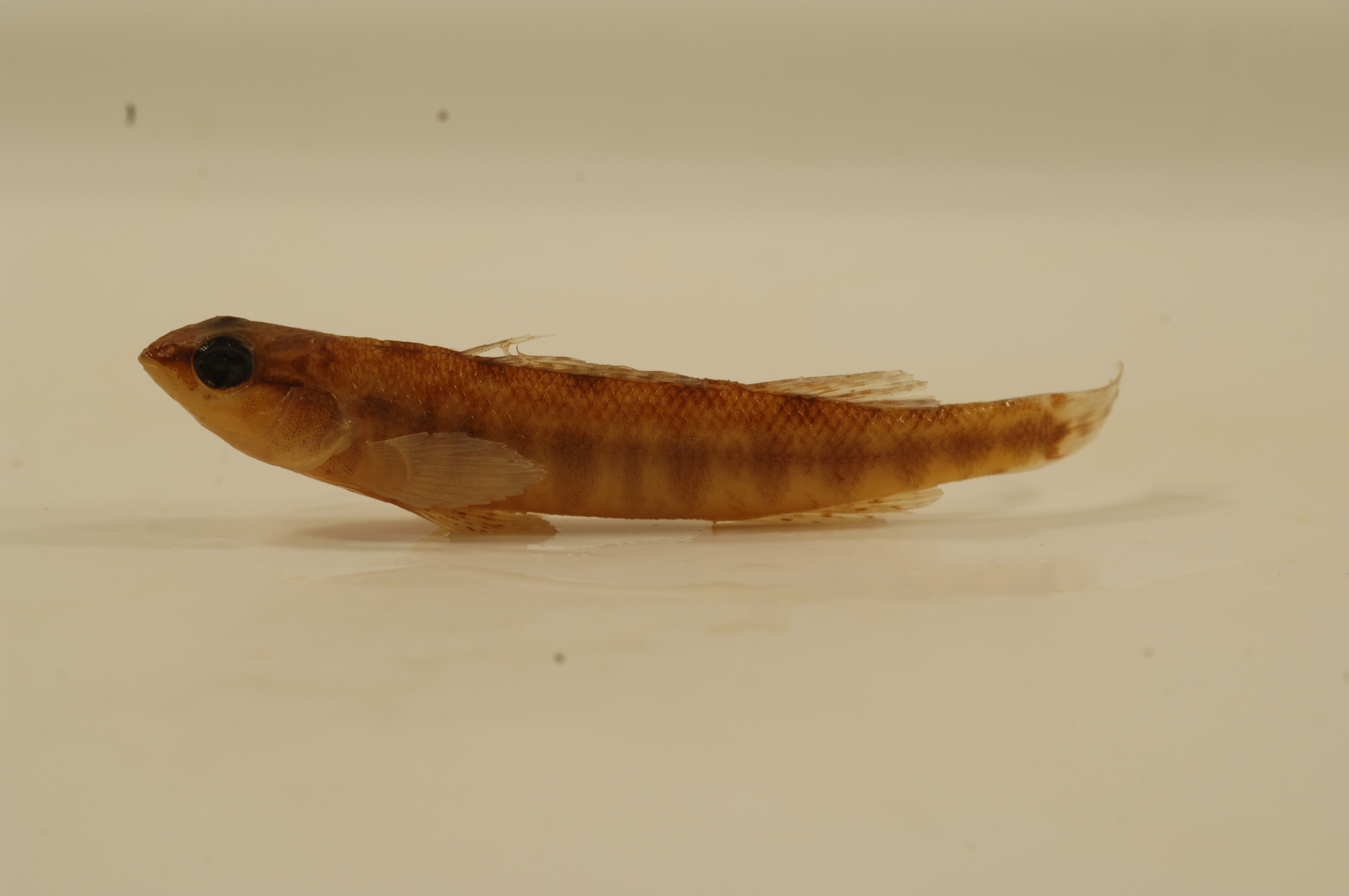
The closely related blackbanded darter, which is similar in appearance to the Halloween darter.

Halloween darters have terete (cylindrical or slightly tapering) bodies, with males longer than females. Males have a maximum standard length of 101 mm (4.0 in), while females have a maximum standard length of 85 mm (3.3 in). Males and females also vary in coloration. Males' heads range in color from a dark, bluish-gray to black, with specks of iridescent green or gold concentrated on their cheeks and opercles (protective coverings of the gills), though also present elsewhere on the head. Its eyes are darkly colored, and the preorbital bar (band of color on the preorbital, or in front of the eye sockets) is black. Both the chin and the lower jaw are bluish-black. Its sides are pale orange with blackish lateral stripes, which may be tinged with iridescent green. Its back is either black or, when possessing distinct saddles, amber or orange with black saddles.

Females have dark olive-black tops of the head, with snouts that are a similar color but paler. Females have variable coloration of the cheek and opercle. They can be medium olive-black with yellow crescent-shaped markings or instead with pale yellow stippling (small dots) or mottling. Similar to males, they have iridescent green or gold speckling, though the speckles are concentrated on the opercles or cleithrum (bone that extends from pectoral fin up to the cranium above the gills). Females' eyes are also dark, and their upper and lower jaws range in color from olive-black to pale yellow. Their abdomens are pale yellowish-green, and their bellies are tinted pink. They also have olive-black lateral stripes and dorsal saddles; the color between the dorsal saddles is amber to pale yellow.

The Halloween darter can be distinguished from other members of its genus by possessing all the following traits: the branchiostegal membranes (membranes that connect the branchiostegal rays, which support the gill membranes) are slightly connected; the edge of the preopercle (bone between cheek and gill membrane) is not serrated; it usually has seven saddle-shaped color bands on its back; and males and females in breeding coloration have yellowish-orange or orange bands near the edge of their first dorsal fins.

== Distribution and habitat ==
The Halloween darter is endemic to the watershed of the Apalachicola River. This is formed from the confluence of two rivers, the Flint River and the Chattahoochee River. In the Flint River basin, the fish occurs both above and below the fall line, being present in several tributaries including Potato Creek, Lazer Creek, Muckalee Creek and Ichawaynochaway Creek. In the Chattahoochee River basin, it occurs above Lake Lanier in the Appalachian foothills of northeast Georgia, in the Chattahoochee itself, in the Chestatee River and the Sautee Creek. It is also present in the Uchee Creek, a tributary that joins the Chattahoochee River near the fall line in Alabama. This fish is typically found in fast-flowing sections of small and medium-sized rivers over bottoms composed of gravel, cobble or rock, often in areas where hornleaf riverweed (Podostemum ceratophyllum) grows.

== Biology and ecology ==
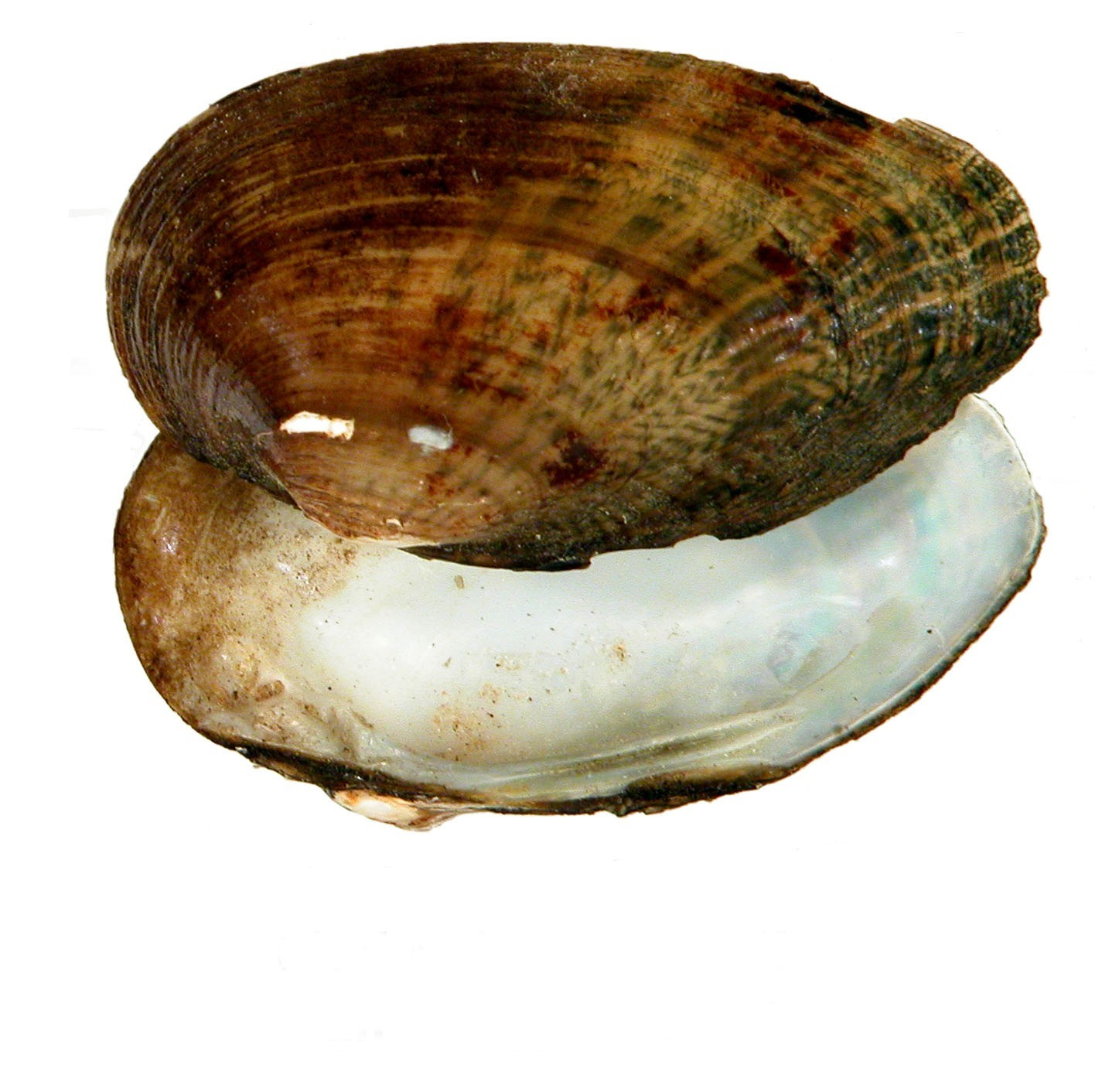
Shell of the gulf moccasinshell (Medionidus penicillatus), which uses the Halloween darter as a host for its larvae

It is insectivorous, consuming a variety of aquatic insects such as mayfly nymphs and larvae of midges, black flies, and caddisflies. Reproduction occurs in the spring, with spawning occurring in April and May, probably in fast-flowing riffle habitats. Females have a clutch size of 23–335 eggs; clutch size increases with female body size. Ripe egg cells are approximately 1.5 mm in diameter. Offspring hatch in June, with juveniles growing to more than half the maximum adult length by October. They reach sexual maturity at one year old. Lifespans likely do not exceed three years.

The Halloween darter is a host species for US federally endangered species of freshwater mussel, the gulf moccasinshell. This mussel releases larvae called glochidia that lodge in the gills of suitable fish to develop into juveniles. Of twenty-four fish species in seven families tested as possible hosts for the gulf moccasinshell's larvae, successful metamorphosis of the larvae only occurred in the Halloween darter and three other darter species. The Halloween darter is also considered a moderately successful host for the larvae of the purple bankclimber mussel, with a metamorphosis success rate of approximately 34%.

== Status and threats ==
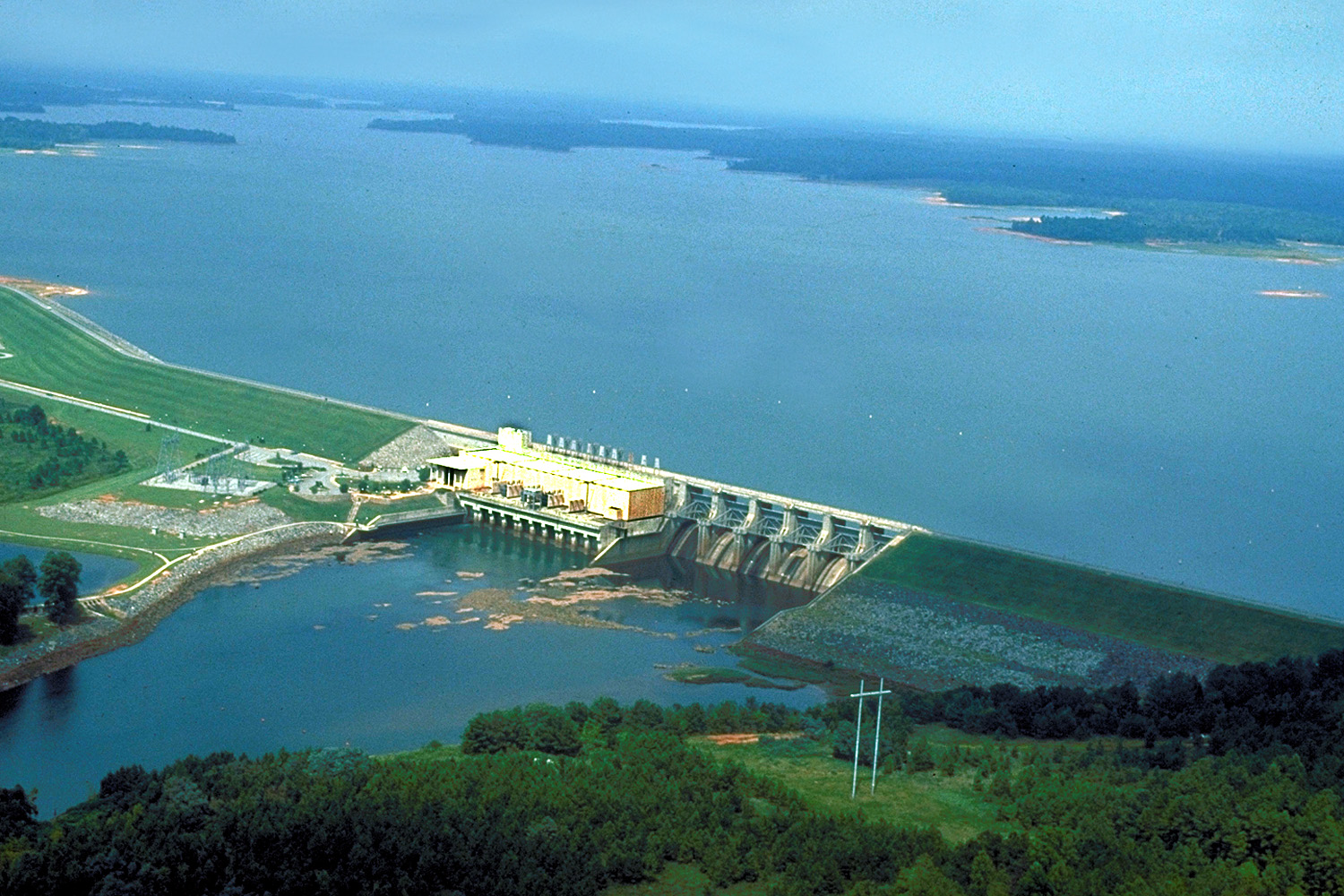
The dam of West Point Lake on the Chattahoochee River; dams along the watershed disrupt population connectivity of the Halloween darter

This fish has several separate populations, and a total area of occupancy of less than 2,000 km^{2} (772 mi^{2}). The chief threat it faces is a deterioration in the quality of its habitat. It typically occurs in deep, fast-flowing sections of waterway, and damming of the rivers has altered the hydrological conditions and siltation. In the US state of Georgia, its four main populations are isolated from each other due to artificial reservoirs. If any of the four populations were to become extinct, recolonization could not occur naturally from any of the other three. Additionally, increased urbanization, water extraction and waste treatment are affecting the water quality of its habitat. For these reasons, the International Union for Conservation of Nature has assessed the conservation status of this fish as being "vulnerable".

In 2010, the United States Fish and Wildlife Service was petitioned by a coalition of environmental organizations (Alabama Rivers Alliance, Center for Biological Diversity, Clinch Coalition, Dogwood Alliance, Gulf Restoration Network, Tennessee Forests Council, West Virginia Highlands Conservancy and activists Tierra Curry and Noah Greenwald) to list 404 aquatic species under the Endangered Species Act of 1973, including the Halloween darter. They included the Halloween darter based on the perceived threats of habitat destruction, as well as insufficient regulatory measures currently in place to protect the species. It is not included on the US Endangered Species Act as of 2019, and its listing status is under review. In Georgia, the Halloween darter is listed as a threatened species. In Alabama, it is protected under the Nongame Species Regulation of the Alabama Department of Conservation and Natural Resources. This makes it illegal to capture, trade, or kill the fish without a permit.

== See also ==
- Christmas darter
