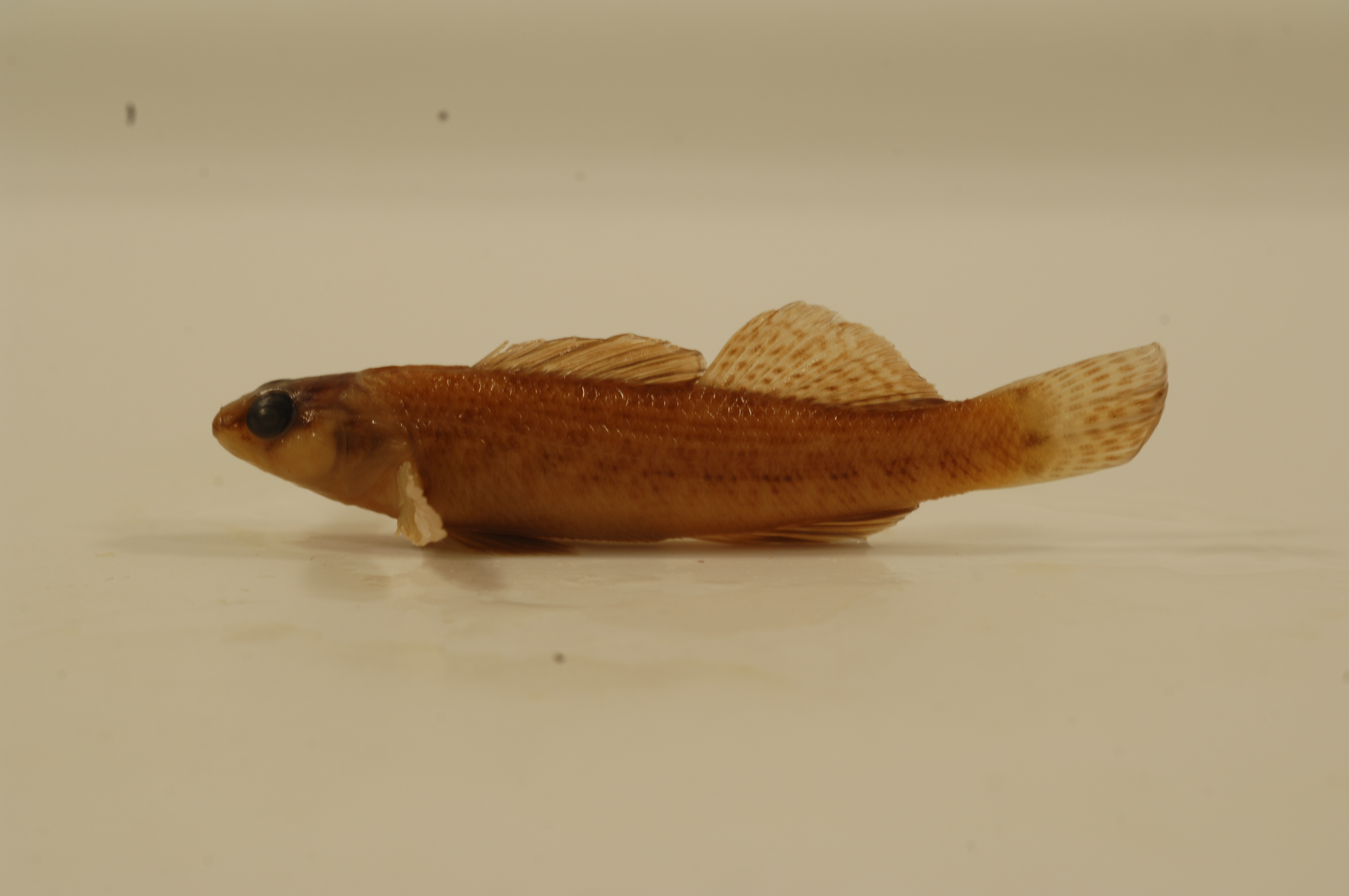

Conservation status
- Least Concern (IUCN 3.1)

Scientific classification
- Kingdom: Animalia
- Phylum: Chordata
- Class: Actinopterygii
- Division: Teleostei
- Order: Perciformes
- Family: Percidae
- Genus: Etheostoma
- Species: E. hopkinsi

Binomial name
- Etheostoma hopkinsi (Fowler, 1945)
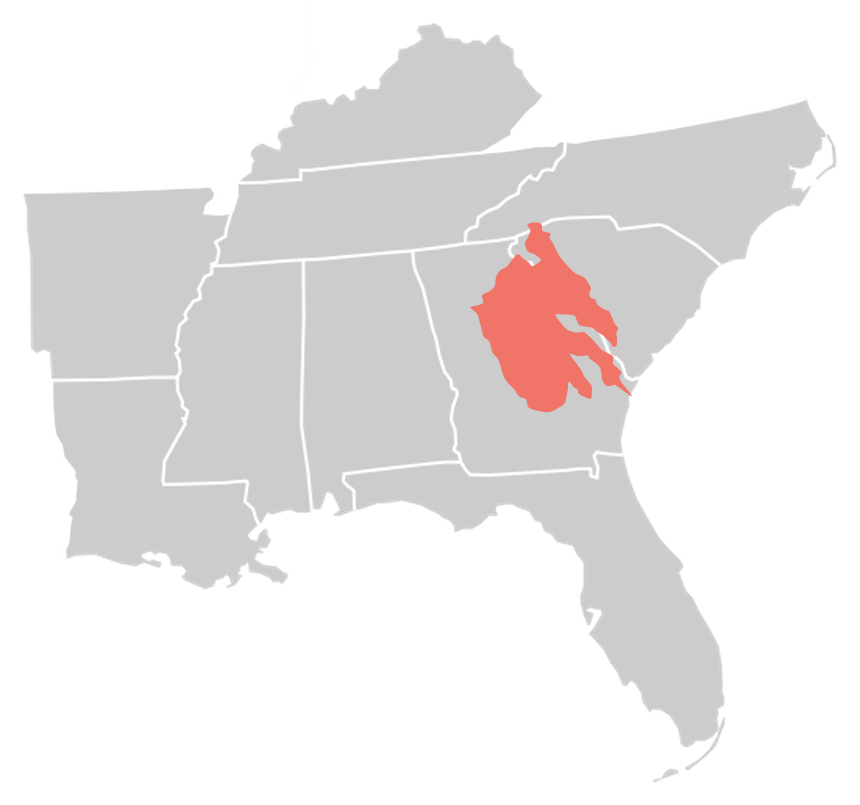

Synonyms
- Poecilichthys hopkinsi Fowler, 1945

= Christmas darter =

Species of ray-finned fish, a darter from the subfamily Etheostomatinae

The Christmas darter (Etheostoma hopkinsi) is a species of ray-finned fish, a darter from the subfamily Etheostomatinae, part of the family Percidae which includes the perches, ruffes and pike-perches. It is found in the Savannah, Ogeechee and Altamaha catchment areas in South Carolina and Georgia. It is a small but colorful fish, typically less than 5 cm (2 in) in total length, with blackish, red and green streaks on its flanks. Green and red are associated with Christmas, hence the common name Christmas darter. Like other darters, it lives on or close to the stream-bed, in riffles and vegetation-laden stretches of small rivers, creeks and spring-fed streams. It feeds on aquatic insects and probably breeds in the spring, but its biology and behavior are poorly known.

The Christmas darter is closely related to the Savannah darter and the Christmas Eve or Hanukkah darter, the latter of which is sometimes considered a subspecies of the Christmas darter rather than a species in its own right. The Christmas darter may hybridize with other darter species, though hybridization is hampered by behavioral and biological barriers. The Christmas darter is a common species in suitable habitat and the International Union for Conservation of Nature (IUCN) has assessed it as being of least concern for conservation purposes. In South Carolina, it is considered a conservation priority species, as it may be threatened in future by impoundment of rivers, siltation and deforestation.

== Taxonomy ==
- - other Etheostoma spp.
  - - E. binotatum
    - - E. hopkinsi
      - E. fricksium

Relationship of the Christmas darter with other members of its genus, based on a 2011 study

The Christmas darter was described as a new species in 1945 by Henry Weed Fowler, who gave it the scientific name Poecilichthys hopkinsi. He suggested the common name of "Hopkin's darter". The holotype was collected by Milton Hopkins, after whom the species was named. It was collected in Oswitchee Springs in Wilcox County, Georgia in 1942. Poecilichthys has since been recognized as a junior synonym of Etheostoma, and the species was reclassified as E. hopkinsi. Its common name of "Christmas darter" is due to the red and green stripes on its body. Some authors have considered the Christmas darter to consist of two subspecies: E. h. hopkinsi (the Christmas darter) and E. h. binotatum (the Christmas Eve or Hanukkah darter). However, the Christmas Eve darter, as E. binotatum, is sometimes identified as a full species rather than a subspecies, such as by the National Center for Biotechnology Information. Conversely, the Integrated Taxonomic Information System does not recognize the Christmas Eve darter as either a full species or a subspecies (the Christmas darter is considered monotypic).

The Christmas darter was traditionally considered part of the Oligocephalus subgenus, though a 2011 study found that the subgenus as defined was paraphyletic (did not contain all descendants of a common ancestor). In a phylogenetic analysis based on mitochondrial and nuclear DNA, the Christmas darter formed a clade with the Christmas Eve darter (E. h. binotatum or E. binotatum) and the Savannah darter (E. fricksium), the latter of which was its sister taxon.

== Description ==
Darters have cylindrical bodies, large paired fins and poorly developed swim bladders; they rest on the substrate and use their pectoral fins for lift when swimming. The Christmas darter has a maximum total length of 6.6 cm (2.6 in) but a more typical length is 4.5 cm (1.8 in). The dorsal fin (back fin) has 10 or 11 spines and 11 to 13 soft rays, the pectoral fin has 12 to 13 rays and the anal fin has 2 spines and 7 to 9 rays. The general color is some shade of yellowish-green, with eight dark dorsal saddles. The flanks have ten to twelve dark bars that turn green or blueish-green in breeding males. These are separated by reddish streaks in mature males and by yellow or orangish streaks in females. The front dorsal fin is a dusky green color, apart from the central portion, which has a broad red stripe in males and a narrow red line in females. The caudal peduncle (end of fish's body where tail fin attaches) has a row of four, somewhat irregular, dark spots. During the breeding season, adult males change color. The breeding male's dorsal fin has a band each of red and blue along the edge. The breeding males are overall more colorful.

The Christmas Eve darter is distinguishable from the Christmas darter by the presence of two dark, rectangular blotches near the top of its head. These blotches are either absent or faint in the Christmas darter. Additionally, the Christmas Eve darter and the Christmas darter differ in their number of lateral scales. The Christmas Eve darter has 41–49 scales, the last 8–13 of which lack pores, while the Christmas darter has 40–47 scales, the last 2–11 of which lack pores.

The Christmas darter can be separated from other members of its genus by a combination of the following traits; the lateral line (sensory organ along each side of the body) is straight; the branchiostegal membranes (structural membranes of the gill) on the gills are moderately connected; a frenum (membrane that attaches the upper lip to the snout) is attached to the upper lip; there are two spines on the anal fin. The Christmas darter is most frequently confused with the Savannah darter, based on the similarities in their appearance and the overlap in their ranges. The Savannah darter differs in having a pale stripe running along the spine and in having dorso-lateral dark streaks rather than dark dorsal saddles. The red stripes on the spinous dorsal fin is at the margin of the fin in the Savannah darter but in the middle in the Christmas darter.

== Distribution and habitat ==
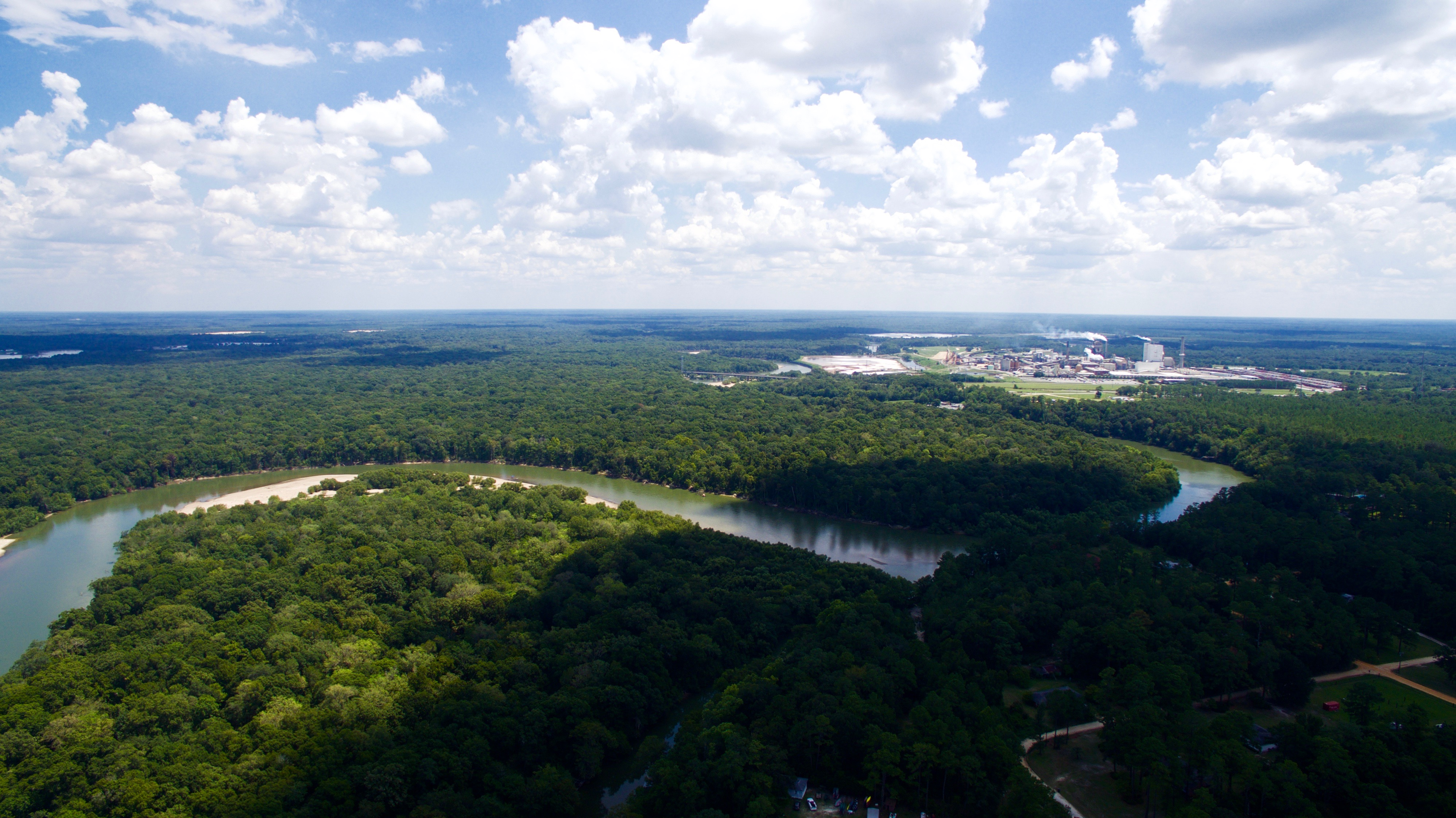
The Altamaha River in Georgia

The Christmas darter is endemic to the states of Georgia and South Carolina in the southeastern United States. The nominate population is restricted to the Altamaha and Ogeechee River drainage basins in Georgia, both above and below the fall line, while the Christmas Eve darter occurs in the Savannah River catchment area, on the border between Georgia and South Carolina. Typical habitats include medium-sized and small rivers and creeks, riffles with rubble and coarse substrates, headwater creeks, and spring-fed streams with plentiful vegetation and sandy bottoms.

== Biology and ecology ==
The Christmas darter's biology is largely unknown. It likely reproduces in March and April. Individuals become sexually mature by the end of their first year of life and have a maximum lifespan of two years. Its diet consists primarily of aquatic insects, though also includes other aquatic invertebrates. It can hybridize with other darter species, though a hybridization study with it and the redband darter (E. luteovinctum) showed variation in hybrid inviability. Hybrid offspring from a Christmas darter female were often severely deformed, dying before hatching. The hybrid offspring of redband darter females had much higher likelihoods of successfully hatching. The major barrier to hybridization, however, is behavioral isolation, meaning that the Christmas darter has a strong preference for mating with members of its own species rather than hybridizing.

== Status ==
The Christmas darter is a common species and does not seem to be facing any particular threats. It occurs in numerous locations in the watersheds it occupies, and there is no reason to suspect that the overall population is decreasing. For these reasons, the International Union for Conservation of Nature has assessed its conservation status as "least concern". As of 2015, it is considered a priority species in the state of South Carolina, along with 56 other freshwater fish. Priority species were species that were not benefitting from federal conservation funding already, those rare or at-risk, those little known to science, or those that could be used as bioindicators. Though many of the listed species of freshwater fish were noted to not be in danger of extinction, their inclusion was justified "if the goal is to maintain South Carolina's rich and diverse fish fauna". Though not presently threatened with extinction, alteration of the watersheds it lives in could seriously reduce its range in the future. Threats to the species could include deforestation, siltation and dams.

== See also ==
- Halloween darter
