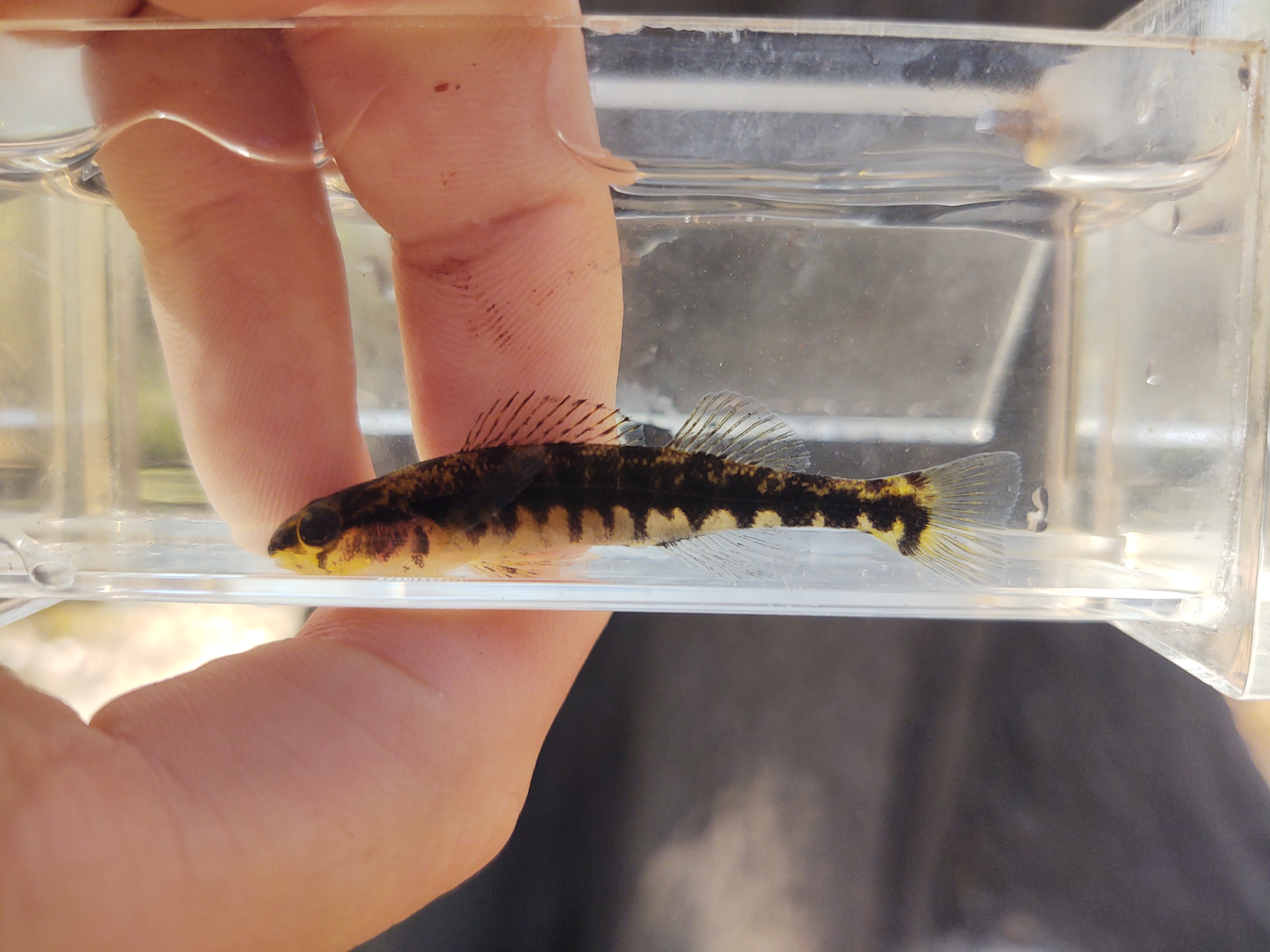

Scientific classification
- Kingdom: Animalia
- Phylum: Chordata
- Class: Actinopterygii
- Order: Perciformes
- Family: Percidae
- Genus: Percina
- Species: P. westfalli

Binomial name
- Percina westfalli (Fowler, 1942)

= Percina westfalli =

Westfall's darter

Species of fish

Percina westfalli, the sooty-banded darter or Westfall's darter is a species of darter (subfamily Etheostomatinae) native to the Southeastern United States. A benthic fish, they typically inhabit streams and smaller rivers over sand or gravel bottoms where they are primarily insectivorous. The species is sympatric with P. crypta within the Apalachicola Basin.

After its initial description the species was later synonymised with P. nigrofasciata, but has since been split and is once again recognised as a full species. There are still many sources that have yet to update their material to accommodate the split.

== Range ==
They occur from the Apalachicola river basin eastwards on the Gulf Slope and from the Savannah river basin south to the St. Johns river basin on the Atlantic Slope. Sources from before this species was split found the former parent taxon, P. nigrofasciata, absent from the Satilla and St. Mary's river systems in Georgia and Florida. Though considered common throughout most of its range, they are thought rare in the Altamaha River.
