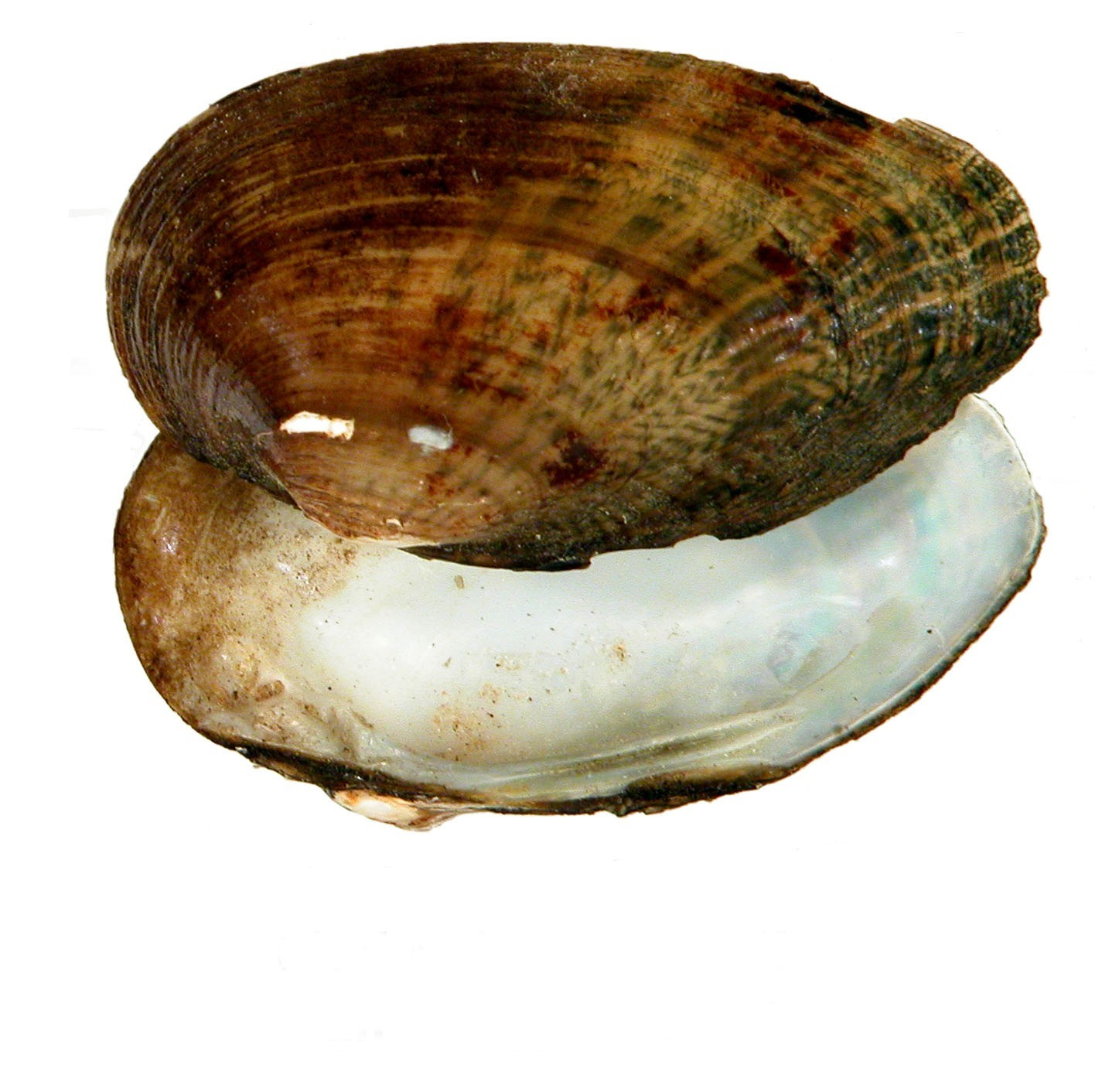

Conservation status
- Critically Endangered (IUCN 2.3)

- Endangered (ESA)

Scientific classification
- Kingdom: Animalia
- Phylum: Mollusca
- Class: Bivalvia
- Order: Unionida
- Family: Unionidae
- Genus: Medionidus
- Species: M. penicillatus

Binomial name
- Medionidus penicillatus (I. Lea, 1857)

Synonyms
- Unio penicillatus Lea, 1857; Unio kingi B.H. Wright, 1900

= Medionidus penicillatus =

Gulf moccasinshell

Species of bivalve

Medionidus penicillatus, the gulf moccasinshell, is a rare species of freshwater mussel in the family Unionidae, the river mussels. This aquatic bivalve mollusk is native to Alabama, Florida, and Georgia in the United States, where it is in decline and has been extirpated from most of the rivers it once inhabited. It is a federally listed endangered species of the United States.

This mussel is up to 5.5 centimeters long. The shell is yellowish or greenish brown with green rays. The nacre of the shell is purplish or greenish with some iridescence.

This mussel is native to the ACF River Basin, the watershed of the Apalachicola, Chattahoochee and Flint Rivers around the intersection of the states of Alabama, Georgia, and Florida. Its range has declined 80% from the known previous distribution. There are fewer than 20 occurrences and it is uncommon at most sites. It is now found in the Flint and Chattahoochee Rivers and four tributaries, and Econfina Creek. It is nearly extirpated from the state of Alabama.

Like other mussels, this species releases larvae called glochidia that lodge in the gills of fish to develop into juvenile mussels. The host fish for this species include Etheostoma edwini (brown darter), Percina nigrofasciata (blackbanded darter), Gambusia holbrooki (eastern mosquitofish), and Poecilia reticulata (guppy), as well as Etheostoma inscriptum (turquoise darter), Etheostoma swaini (Gulf darter), and Percina crypta (Halloween darter).
