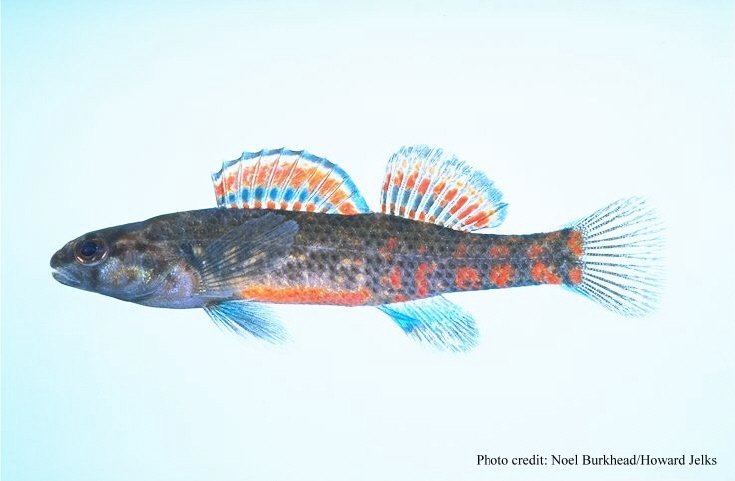

Conservation status
- Least Concern (IUCN 3.1)

Scientific classification
- Kingdom: Animalia
- Phylum: Chordata
- Class: Actinopterygii
- Order: Perciformes
- Family: Percidae
- Genus: Etheostoma
- Species: E. swaini

Binomial name
- Etheostoma swaini (D. S. Jordan, 1884)

Synonyms
- Poecilichthys swaini D. S. Jordan, 1884

= Gulf darter =

Species of fish

The gulf darter (Etheostoma swaini) is a species of freshwater ray-finned fish, a darter from the subfamily Etheostomatinae, part of the family Percidae, which also contains the perches, ruffes and pikeperches. It is found in Louisiana, Mississippi, Alabama, Florida, Tennessee, and Kentucky. It is a colorful fish, males having vertical barring of red-orange and blue-green near the tail, growing to a length of about 7.8 centimeters (3.1 in). It is typically found in small and medium-sized creeks, often in very shallow water. It occurs over sandy bottoms and among aquatic vegetation such as Sparganium americanum, foraging among the plants and organic debris for insect larvae and small invertebrates. The International Union for Conservation of Nature has assessed its conservation status as being of "least concern".

== Appearance and anatomy ==
The gulf darter is known for its laterally compressed, robust body, small, conical head, slightly joined gill membranes and a wide frenum on its upper lip. The back has seven to nine diffuse, square saddles and a distinctive light pre-dorsal stripe. Horizontal light and dark banding is evident along the sides. Along their sides, breeding males have alternating red-orange and blue-green vertical bars that are most developed near the caudal fin. On average, gulf darters are 5.3 centimeters (2.1 in) long; they can grow up to 7.8 centimeters (3.1 in) long.

== Distribution and habitat ==
The gulf darter generally inhabits small- to moderate-sized creeks, and occurs over a sand or sandy mud bottom, often in association with aquatic vegetation or a layer of organic debris. It can be found from Lake Pontchartrain, Louisiana east to the Ochlockonee River drainage, Florida, and in many eastern tributaries of the Mississippi River from Buffalo Bayou, Mississippi, north to the Obion River system of Tennessee and Kentucky. The gulf darter is frequently encountered in extremely shallow locations, often foraging in water less than 5 centimeters (2.0 in).

In most creeks, the microhabitat of the gulf darter is characterized by moderate to heavy amounts of aquatic vegetation, primarily Sparganium americanum. These fish actively forage in and among clumps of vegetation and they also use the areas of reduced current downstream from these clumps as resting sites. In larger, predominately vegetated creeks, it inhabits quiet streamside areas of sand and sand-silt substrates. In the smallest creeks, however, the gulf darter may occasionally be found in shallow, swift riffles formed by logs, rocks or vegetation. The gulf darter has a low tolerance for brackish water.

== Ecology ==
In its preferred microhabitat, this darter is usually associated with the speckled madtom (Noturus leptacanthus) and the blackbanded darter (Percina nigrofasciata), and often with southern brook lamprey (Ichthyomyzon gagei) larvae. The blackbanded darter appears to be the most ecologically similar species to the gulf darter; however, the extent to which they may compete is not known. The blackbanded darter forages in a much wider variety of microhabitats and does not exploit vegetation or organic debris to the extent the gulf darter does.

Gulf darters are classified as insectivores, feeding on small invertebrates, including black flies, mayflies, and dragonflies. One studied found larval dipterans are the most important food items in fish of all sizes, in which chironomids were found in 71–100% of the stomachs examined. The primary predators of the gulf darter probably are larger freshwater fish, such as burbots (Lota lota), stonecats (Noturus flavus), and smallmouth bass (Micropterus dolomieu). Gulf darters, like many other darter species, have the ability to maintain position on the substrate in flowing water. This unique characteristic plays a key role in its microhabitat preference.

== Lifecycle ==
Gulf darters may live up to 35 months. The gulf darter mates during mid-February to late March, typically when water temperatures are between 5.5 and 17.0 °C; they congregate on gravel shoals where the stream leaves a pool to mate. Once mates are selected, the fish mate repeatedly for several days until the female lays about 90 eggs. Once the eggs are laid, females will begin burrowing into the gravel, submerging herself and the eggs, as a form of protection. Males tend to exhibit territorial behavior during breeding season.

== Taxonomy ==
The Gulf darter was first formally described in 1877 by the American biologist David Starr Jordan (1851–1931) with the type locality given as a tributary of the Pearl River at Monticello in Lawrence County, Mississippi. The specific name honors the biologist Joseph Swain (1857–1927), who was a colleague of Jordan's.

== Conservation ==
Gulf darters may be threatened by runoff and pollution due to urbanization. For instance, one study found the development of an interstate negatively affected the abundance of several fish species, including the gulf darter, by decreasing quality of water of the nearby creek. No current management plans specifically designed for the gulf darter are in place. The population trend of this fish seems to be stable and it is a common species with numerous sub-populations over a wide range, and the International Union for Conservation of Nature has assessed its conservation status as being of "least concern".
