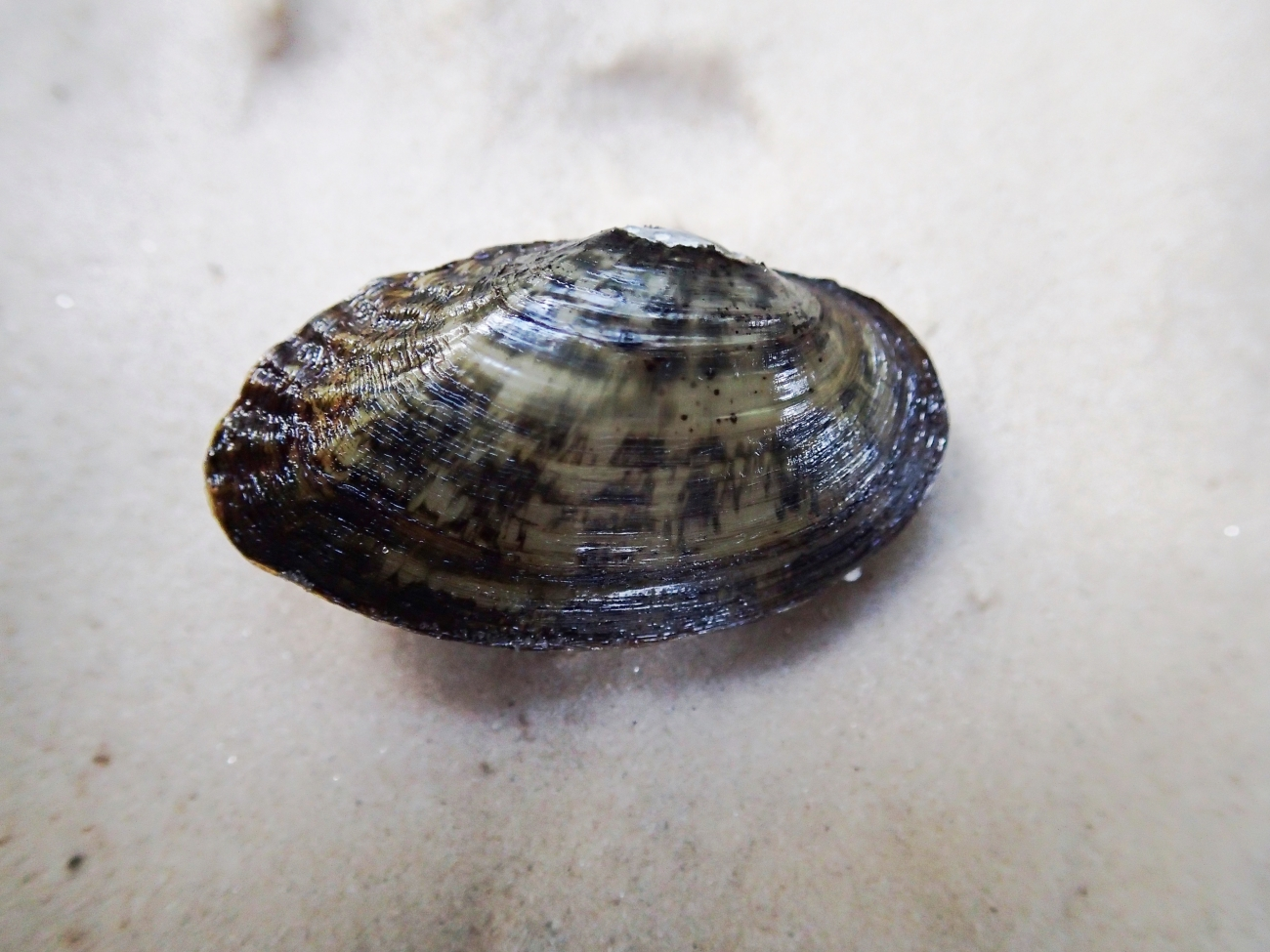

Conservation status
- Critically Endangered (IUCN 2.3)

- Secure (NatureServe)

Scientific classification
- Kingdom: Animalia
- Phylum: Mollusca
- Class: Bivalvia
- Order: Unionida
- Family: Unionidae
- Genus: Medionidus
- Species: M. simpsonianus

Binomial name
- Medionidus simpsonianus Walker, 1905

= Ochlockonee moccasinshell =

Species of bivalve

The Ochlockonee moccasinshell (Medionidus simpsonianus) is a species of freshwater mussel, an aquatic bivalve mollusk in the family Unionidae, the river mussels.

This species is endemic to the United States. Its natural habitat is rivers.

== Original description ==
Medionidus simpsonianus was described as a species by Bryant Walker in 1905 in The Nautilus journal:

Medionidus simpsonianus n. sp. PI. ix. figs. 4 and 5.

Shell small, rather thin, somewhat inflated, elliptical, inequilateral, strongly plicate on the posterior slope. Epidermis dark yellow, smooth, polished, covered with dark green pencilled rays which tend to break into a net-work of angular lines covering the entire surface. Anterior end compressed, rounded, and slightly elevated above the line of the hinge superiorly; posterior extremity obtusely rounded, the tip being nearly on the median line of the shell; posterior ridge somewhat angled; dorsal slope covered with strong sub-concentric, somewhat irregular ridges extending from the posterior ridge to the margin; basal margin regularly curved; hinge margin nearly straight, slightly angled between the cardinal and lateral teeth. Cardinal teeth crenulate, erect, rather compressed, those in left valve nearly on the same line; lateral teeth slender, straight and nearly smooth. Anterior cicatrices well impressed, posterior cicatrices distinct, dorsal cicatrices under the plate behind the cardinal teeth. Beak cavity rather shallow, cavity of the shell deep and uniform. Nacre bluish-white, rather thicker anteriorly.

Length 36; height 19, width 13 mm.

Habitat, Calvary, Ga.

Only three specimens of this little species were received, and these, unfortunately, without any information as to the stream where they were found.

This species belongs to the "conradicus" group of Medionidus as defined by Simpson, and is most nearly related to M. penicillatus. But it differs decidedly from all the described species in the compression of the anterior end, the elevation of the superior-anterior margin and the regularly rounded posterior margin, which is equally curved above and below, the tip being nearly on the median line and not depressed toward the basal margin as in all the allied species. The ridges on the posterior slope are quite as strong, but not so numerous as in M. kinyii.

It is named in honor of Mr. Charles Torrey Simpson....
