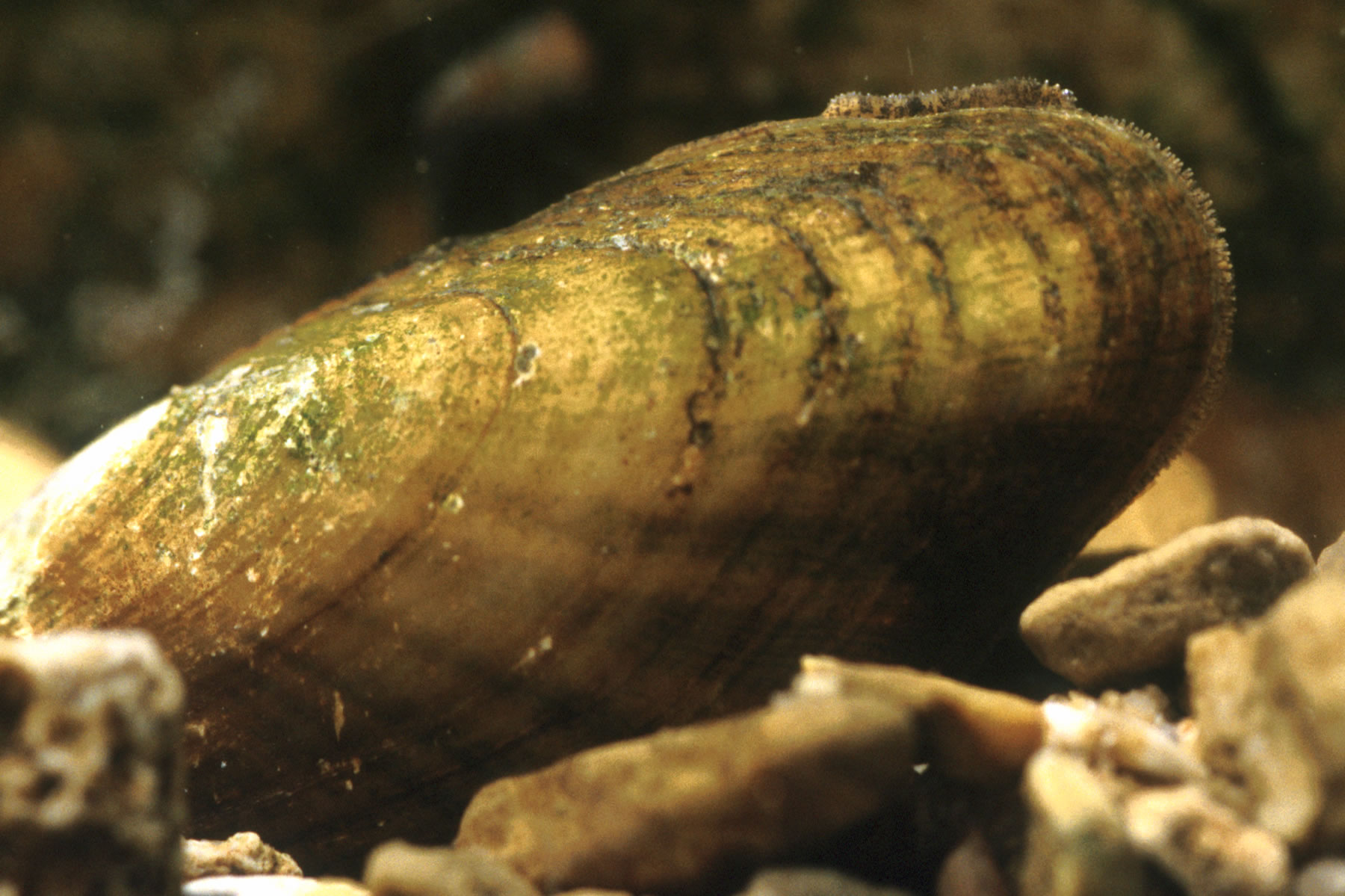

Conservation status
- Near Threatened (IUCN 2.3)

- Vulnerable (NatureServe)

Scientific classification
- Kingdom: Animalia
- Phylum: Mollusca
- Class: Bivalvia
- Order: Unionida
- Family: Unionidae
- Genus: Medionidus
- Species: M. conradicus

Binomial name
- Medionidus conradicus (I. Lea, 1834)

= Medionidus conradicus =

Species of bivalve

Medionidus conradicus is a species of freshwater mussel, an aquatic bivalve mollusk in the family Unionidae, the river mussels.

This species is endemic to the drainages of the Cumberland River and the Tennessee River in the United States.
