= Milton Hopkins (biologist) =

American botanist and professor

Milton C. Hopkins
- Born: September 12, 1906; Glen Cove, Long Island
- Died: March 25, 1983 (aged 76); St. Francis Hospital, Flower Hill, New York
- Education: Amherst College; Harvard University
- Scientific career
- Fields: Biology
- Author abbrev. (botany): M.Hopkins

Milton Hopkins Jr. (1906–1983) was an American historian, professor of biology, and an editor of college textbooks.

== Biography ==
In 1917 Milton Hopkins Jr. moved with his family to Port Washington, New York and attended elementary school and high school there. In 1930 he received his bachelor's degree from Amherst College. After graduating with M.A. and Ph.D. in biology from Harvard University, he was a professor of biology from 1936 to 1945 at the University of Oklahoma.

In 1944 he married Elizabeth Robbins Hewlett. In 1945 they returned to the Port Washington area to live in the Hewlett Homestead. Located in the Village of Flower Hill, the home was built in the early 1700s and occupied by eight generations of the Hewlett family before being sold to the real estate developer Ivo Matkovic.

From 1945 until retirement, Milton Hopkins was editor-in-chief of college textbooks at Holt, Rinehart & Winston. He was a local historian of Long Island and president of the Cow Neck Peninsula Historical Society of Port Washington. Milton and Elizabeth Hopkins lived in the historic Hewlett Homestead until 1980. Upon his death, he was survived by his widow, a daughter, and two granddaughters.

=== Death ===
Hopkins died on March 25, 1983, at St. Francis Hospital in Flower Hill, New York. He was 76 at the time of his death.

== Legacy ==
A small green space on East Gate Road in Flower Hill is named Milton Hopkins Green in honor of Hopkins.

== Taxon named in his honor ==
The Christmas darter (Etheostoma hopkinsi) is named after him.

== Selected publications ==
- Hopkins, Milton (1935). "Notes on Lespedeza". Rhodora. 37 (439): 264–266. JSTOR 23300288.
- —— (1937). "Arabis in eastern and central North America (Continued)". Rhodora. 39 (460): 106–148. JSTOR 23300659.
- —— (1938). "Notes from the herbarium of the University of Oklahoma—I". Rhodora. 40 (479): 425–434. JSTOR 23301951.
- —— (1942). "Cercis in North America". Rhodora. 44 (522): 193–211. JSTOR 23301997.
- ——; Waterfall, U. T. (1943). "Notes on Oklahoma plants". Rhodora. 45 (532): 113–117. JSTOR 23302105.
- —— (1943). "Notes from the Bebb Herbarium of the University of Oklahoma—II". Rhodora. 45 (535): 265–277. JSTOR 23301989.
