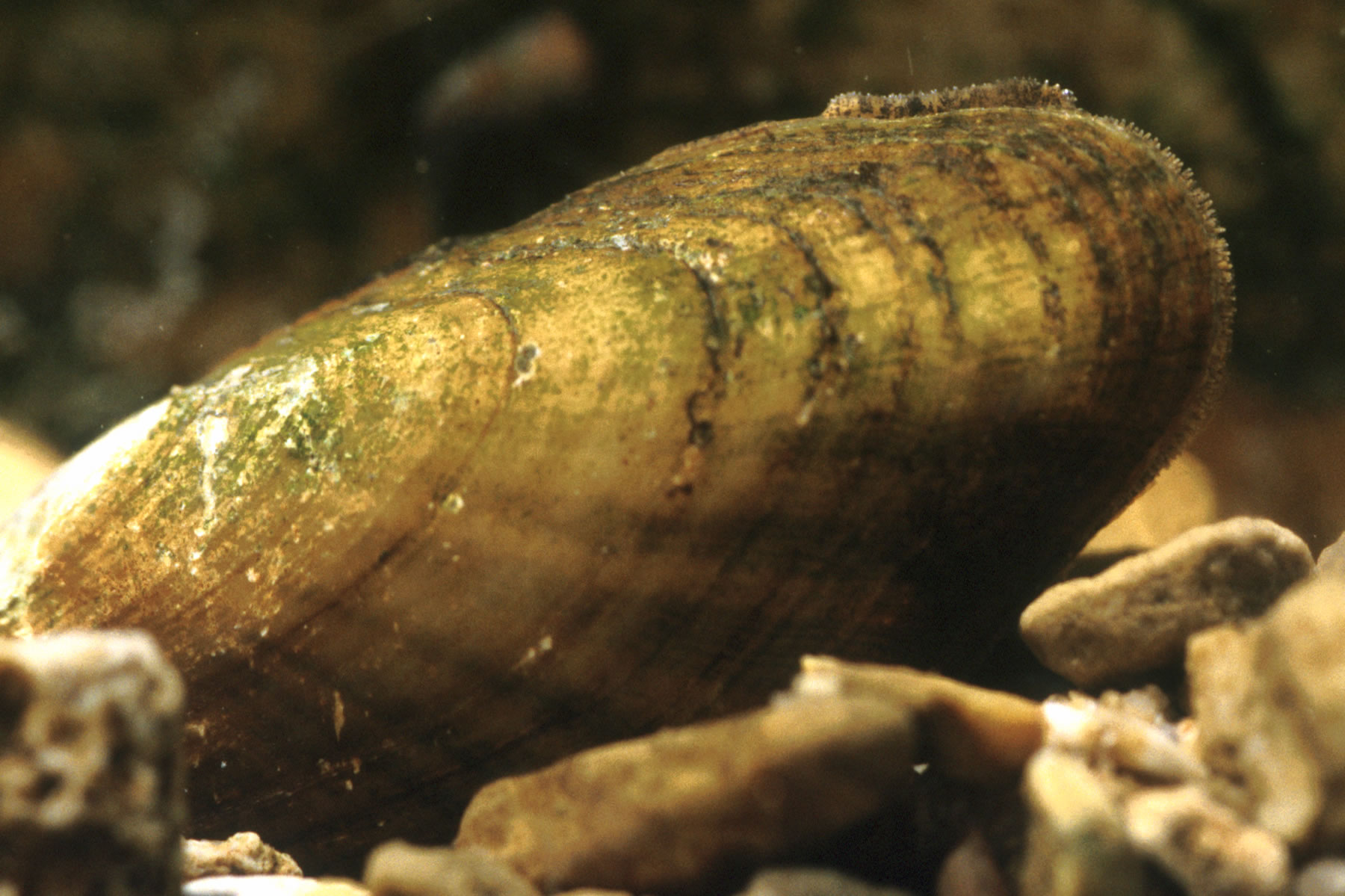
- Medionidus conradicus

Scientific classification
- Domain: Eukaryota
- Kingdom: Animalia
- Phylum: Mollusca
- Class: Bivalvia
- Order: Unionida
- Family: Unionidae
- Tribe: Lampsilini
- Genus: Medionidus; Simpson, 1900

= Medionidus =

Genus of bivalves

Medionidus is a genus of freshwater mussels, aquatic bivalve mollusks in the family Unionidae.

== Species within the genus Medionidus ==
- Medionidus acutissimus (Alabama moccasinshell)
- Medionidus conradicus
- Medionidus parvulus (Coosa moccasinshell)
- Medionidus penicillatus (gulf moccasinshell)
- Medionidus simpsonianus (Ochlockonee moccasinshell)
- Medionidus walkeri
