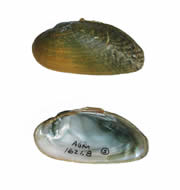

Conservation status
- Endangered (IUCN 3.1)

- Critically Imperiled (NatureServe)

Scientific classification
- Kingdom: Animalia
- Phylum: Mollusca
- Class: Bivalvia
- Order: Unionida
- Family: Unionidae
- Genus: Medionidus
- Species: M. parvulus

Binomial name
- Medionidus parvulus (I. Lea, 1860)

= Medionidus parvulus =

Coosa moccasinshell

Species of bivalve

Medionidus parvulus, the Coosa moccasinshell, is a rare species of freshwater mussel in the family Unionidae, the river mussels. This aquatic bivalve mollusk is native to Georgia and Tennessee in the United States, and has been extirpated from the state of Alabama. It is a federally listed endangered species of the United States.

This mussel is up to 4 centimeters long or occasionally larger and has a thin, fragile, dark brown or yellow-brown shell. The nacre of the shell is blue, sometimes with pink areas.

This mussel is native to the Mobile River drainage, where it was once sporadic but widespread. This species is rare except in Polk County, Tennessee, where it is locally common in the Conasauga River. It can also be found in the tributary Holly Creek, which extends into Georgia. It is in severe decline, having been extirpated from much of the Coosa River system and all of the waterways in Alabama where it once occurred.
