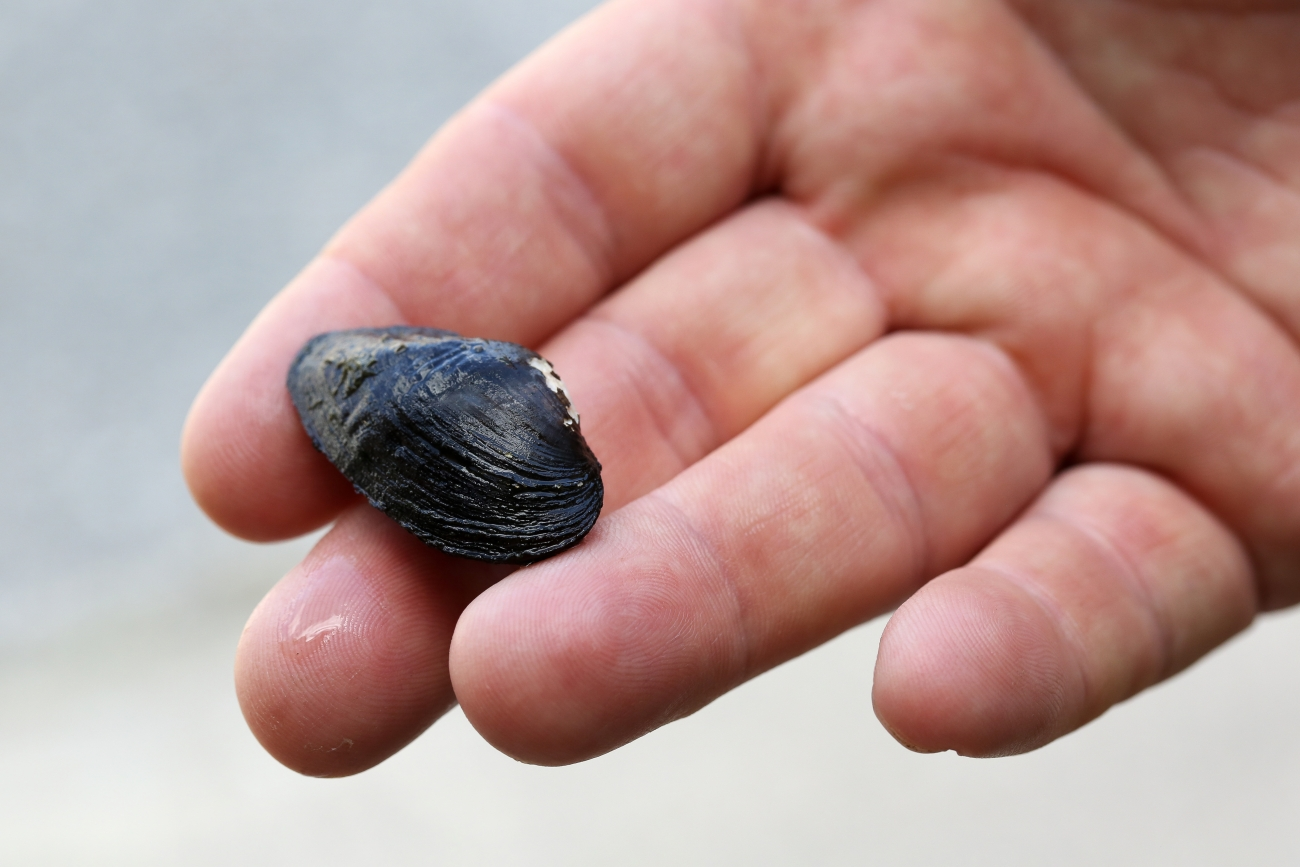

Conservation status
- Critically Endangered (IUCN 3.1)

- Critically Imperiled (NatureServe)

Scientific classification
- Kingdom: Animalia
- Phylum: Mollusca
- Class: Bivalvia
- Order: Unionida
- Family: Unionidae
- Genus: Medionidus
- Species: M. walkeri

Binomial name
- Medionidus walkeri (S. H. Wright, 1897)

= Medionidus walkeri =

Species of bivalve

Medionidus walkeri, the Suwannee moccasinshell is a species of freshwater mussel, an aquatic bivalve mollusk in the family Unionidae, the river mussels.

This species is endemic to the United States, in the Suwannee River basin in the states of Georgia and Florida.

It is a small, oval-shaped mussel that rarely exceeds 2 inches (51 mm) in length. The shell has corrugations on the posterior end. In younger individuals it is greenish yellow to brown with varying green rays, and olive brown to black with obscured rays in older individuals. They are sexually dimorphic, with females being smaller and longer than males.

It prefers sloped banks of streams with muddy sand substrate. Springs are important to the habitat of both the species and its darter host fish (Etheostoma and Percina species). It is threatened by habitat destruction, pollution, invasive species, climate change, and small population size.
