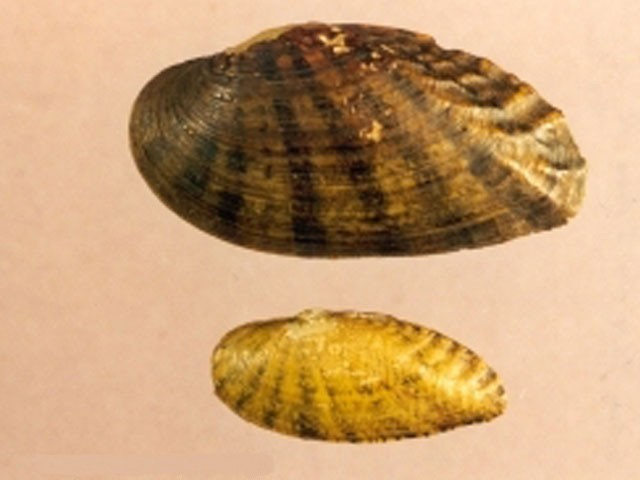

Conservation status
- Endangered (IUCN 2.3)

- Threatened (ESA)

Scientific classification
- Kingdom: Animalia
- Phylum: Mollusca
- Class: Bivalvia
- Order: Unionida
- Family: Unionidae
- Genus: Medionidus
- Species: M. acutissimus

Binomial name
- Medionidus acutissimus (I. Lea, 1831)

Synonyms
- Unio acutissimus Unio rubellinus

= Medionidus acutissimus =

Species of bivalve

Medionidus acutissimus, the Alabama moccasinshell, is a species of freshwater mussel in the family Unionidae, the river mussels. It is native to Alabama, Mississippi, Georgia, Tennessee, and possibly Florida. It is a federally listed threatened species of the United States.

This aquatic bivalve mollusk is about 3 centimeters long with a thin yellow or brownish yellow shell. The nacre is mostly translucent with a salmon pink area.

This mussel is native to the Mobile River drainage, where it was once widespread. Its numbers are now low, with only one population, in the Sipsey Fork, appearing to be stable. The highest numbers are found in streams in Bankhead National Forest, where it is common in some areas. It is probably extirpated from Florida and the rivers along the Gulf Coast.
