= Nora Mill Dam =

Log dam

- Nora Mill Dam

- Location within Georgia
- Location: White County, Georgia
- Coordinates: 34°41′26.3″N 83°42′42.74″W
- Primary inflows: Chattahoochee River
- Primary outflows: Chattahoochee River
- Basin countries: United States

Nora Mill Dam is a log dam about one mile or 1.5 km south of Helen, Georgia on the Chattahoochee River. The dam was built in 1824, and there is still a working grist mill at the site. The historic Nora Mill Granary was established in 1876, and is operated a business open to the public, selling grits, cornmeal, and other products which it mills in front of customers (though much of it is covered for safety reasons).
