= Lazer Creek =

Stream in Georgia, U.S.

Coordinates: 32°48′38.48″N 84°24′10.71″W

Lazer Creek is a stream in the U.S. state of Georgia. It is a tributary to Flint River.

According to historian John Goff, the origin of the name Lazer Creek is obscure. Lazer Creek most likely was named after a pioneer settler.
