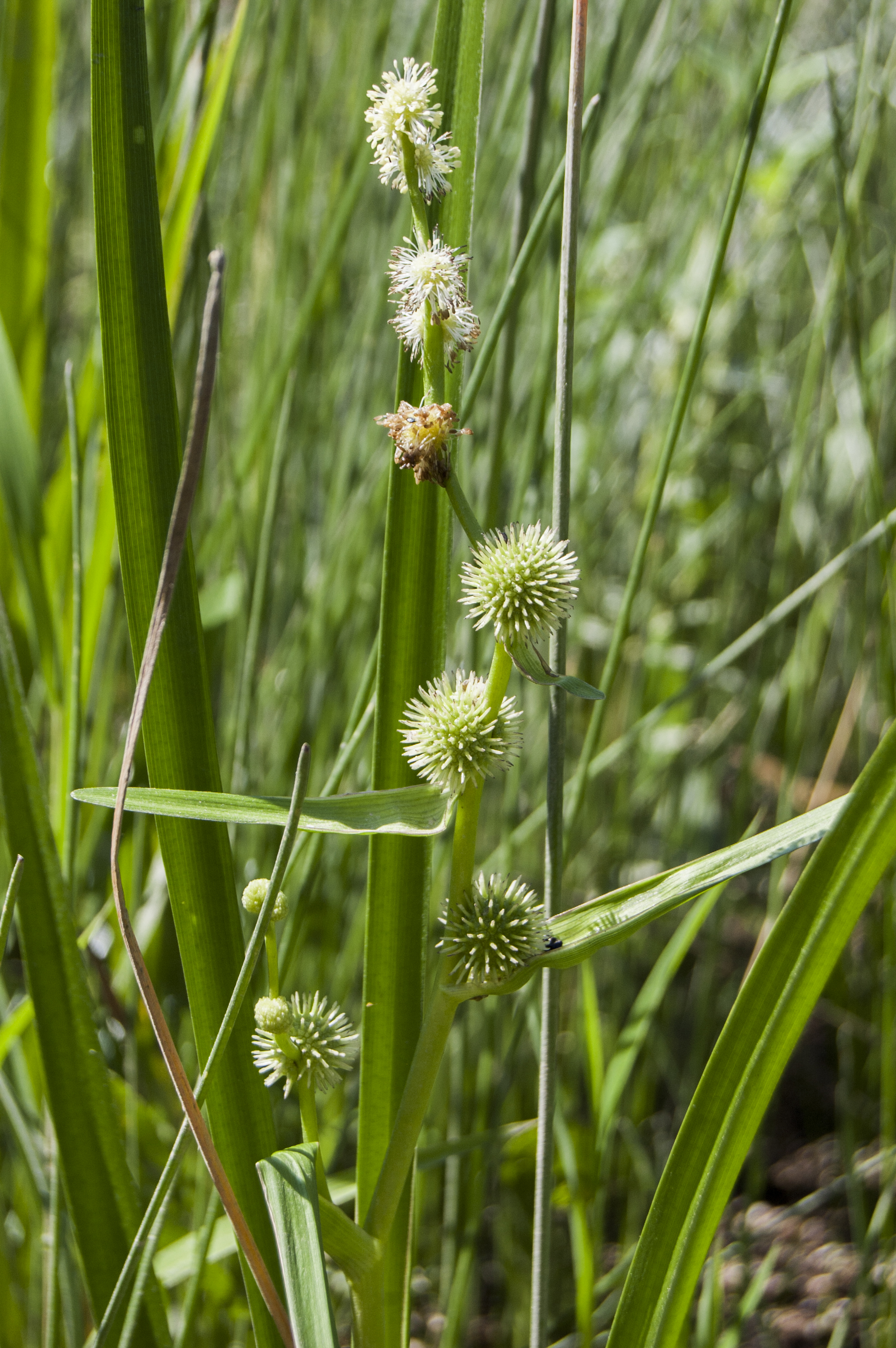

Conservation status
- Least Concern (IUCN 3.1)

Scientific classification
- Kingdom: Plantae
- Clade: Tracheophytes
- Clade: Angiosperms
- Clade: Monocots
- Clade: Commelinids
- Order: Poales
- Family: Typhaceae
- Genus: Sparganium
- Species: S. americanum

Binomial name
- Sparganium americanum Nutt.

= Sparganium americanum =

Species of flowering plant

Sparganium americanum, American bur-reed, is a perennial plant found in the United States of America and Canada. Though this species resembles a grass, it is a type of bur-reed. This species is important for conservation purposes because it has the ability to remove nitrogen and phosphorus runoff from water, like many other wetland species. By doing this, it protects waterways from excess nitrogen which can cause eutrophication. This increased nitrogen is especially a problem during the farmers' growing season. During this same time frame the S. americanum is growing and taking up nitrogen.

== Distribution ==
American bur-reed grows from spring to fall in low marsh and shallow water (from 0 to 12 inches of water) in the United States of America and Canada. In the United States, American bur-reed is found in Alabama, Arkansas, Connecticut, Washington DC, Delaware, Florida, Georgia, Iowa, Illinois, Indiana, Kansas, Kentucky, Louisiana, Massachusetts, Maryland, Maine, Michigan, Missouri, Mississippi, North Carolina, North Dakota, New Jersey, New York, Ohio, Oklahoma, Pennsylvania, Rhode Island, South Carolina, Tennessee, Texas, Virginia, Vermont, Wisconsin, and West Virginia. In Canada, American bur-reed can be found in Manitoba, New Brunswick, Newfoundland, Nova Scotia, Ontario, Prince Edward, and Quebec.

== Habitat and ecology ==
Sparganium americanum is a perennial plant. It grows in low marsh and shallow water, surviving in water up to 12 inches deep. This species helps stabilize muddy areas. Waterfowl and other animals feed on the seeds of S. americanum and some animals also eat their leaves.It lives in peaty to sandy soils along lakeshores, slow moving streams and as floating vegetation in boggy lakes. In a paper by the State University of New York at Binghamton, scientists showed that S. americanum accrued more aboveground biomass and lower belowground biomass than the other four wetland plant species the study looked at; Phalaris arundinacea, Scirpus cyperinus, Juncus effusus, and Calamagrostis canadensis. The study also showed that S. americanum had the highest concentration of nitrogen and phosphorus in aboveground tissue compared to the other species in the study. Even though S. americanum accumulated the most aboveground nitrogen and phosphorus, this species lost so much phosphorus that its net retention dropped below that of other species in the study. In the short run, American bur-reed is helpful in retaining nutrients from agricultural runoff.

Waterfowl and marsh birds eat the seeds, and muskrats eat from the entire plant.

== Morphology ==
Sparganium americanum is a monocot plant. Individuals of this species may look like grass, but they aren't. Individual American bur-reeds can grow to be between two and four feet. The leaves are green and are triangular in cross section; the leaves of individuals living in deeper water can produce floating leaves.

== Flowers and fruit ==
Sparganium americanum spread rapidly through their underground root systems of rhizomes. It flowers in the summer time. The inflorescence can be branched or simple. The fruits have a dull surface with beaks that are between 2 and 5 millimeters long. These beaks may be straight, but some of them may be curved. The flower tepals can have a dark spot on them.
