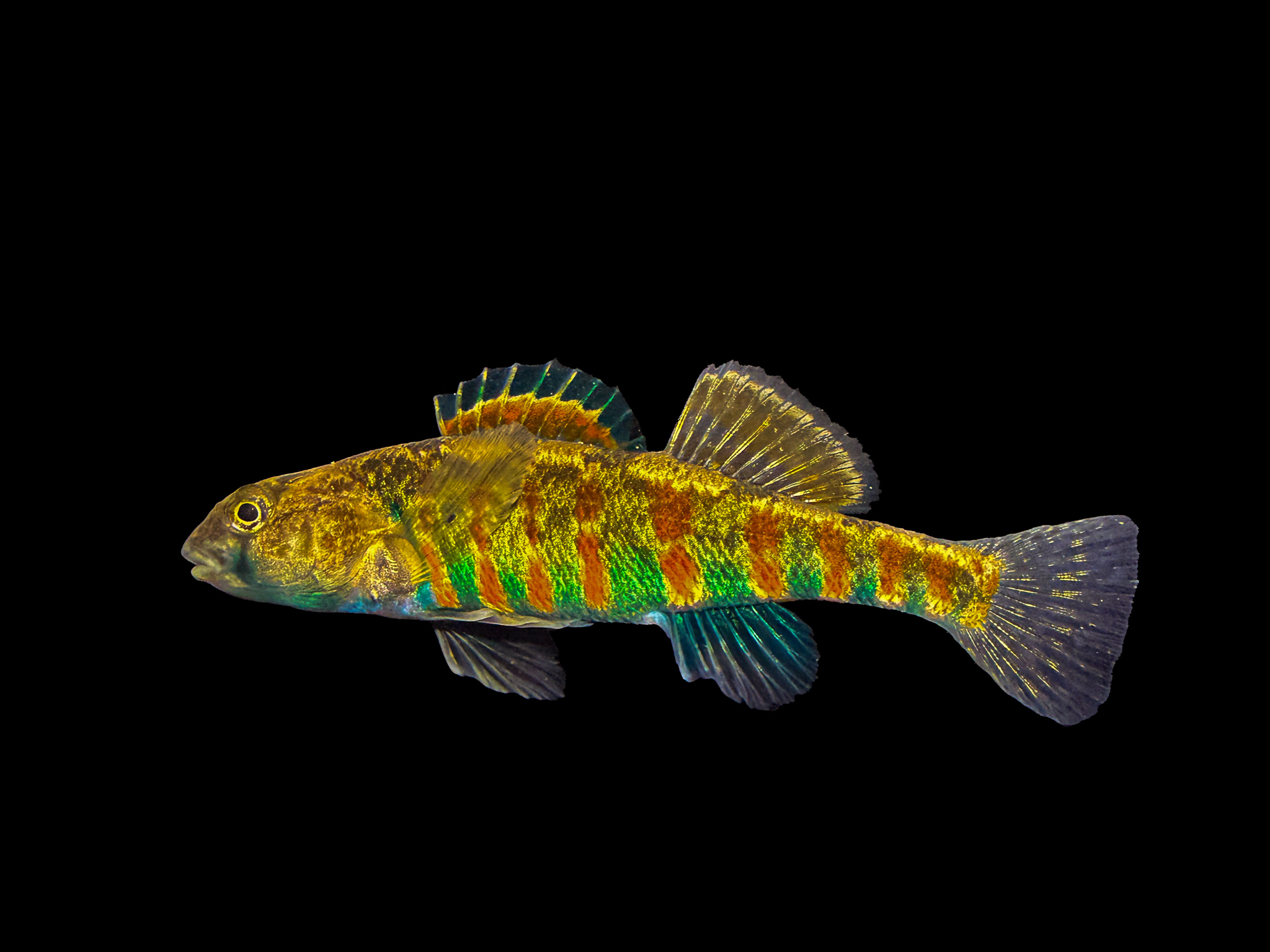

Conservation status
- Least Concern (IUCN 3.1)

Scientific classification
- Kingdom: Animalia
- Phylum: Chordata
- Class: Actinopterygii
- Order: Perciformes
- Family: Percidae
- Genus: Etheostoma
- Species: E. luteovinctum

Binomial name
- Etheostoma luteovinctum C. H. Gilbert & Swain, 1887

= Redband darter =

Species of fish

The redband darter (Etheostoma luteovinctum) is a species of freshwater ray-finned fish, a darter from the subfamily Etheostomatinae, part of the family Percidae, which also contains the perches, ruffes and pikeperches. It is endemic to the state of Tennessee in the eastern United States.

== Geographic distribution ==
The redband darter is found in the Stone's and Collins rivers in the Cumberland River drainage and Duck River in the Tennessee River drainage systems in central Tennessee.

== Habitat ==
The redband darter inhabits shallow pools with rocky substrates as well as streams and springs. These springs, which are usually of moderate gradient and have limestone bedrock, rubble, gravel, and silt substrates. Such streams are very productive and usually have growths of aquatic mosses, filamentous algae, and/or watercress. Spawning occurs during March and April. During this time, individuals are common in gravel riffles, which may be the spawning area. This species feeds mainly on midge larvae.

== Description ==
The redband darter can reach a length of 6.8 centimetres (2.7 in) TL though most only reach about 5.8 centimetres (2.3 in). The common name refers to the breeding males which develop red bands along their flanks and on the dorsal fin.

== Taxonomy ==
The redband darter was first formally described in 1887 by the American ichthyologist Charles Henry Gilbert (1859–1928) and biologist Joseph Swain (1857–1927), with the type locality given as the Stones River near Nashville, Tennessee. It is regarded as a member of the subgenus Oligocephalus.
