= Dogwood Alliance =

Environmental organization based in North Carolina, US

Dogwood Alliance is an environmental nonprofit organization based in Asheville, North Carolina, that advocates against forestry practices in the region. They work with paper producers and customers to move them away from sourcing their paper from endangered forests, instead directing them toward post-consumer recycled fiber and other environmentally-friendly alternatives. They are also developing a campaign to monetize environmental resources called Carbon Canopy, and a campaign against the use of whole trees for biofuel energy (called woody biofuel) entitled Our Forests Aren't Fuel.
