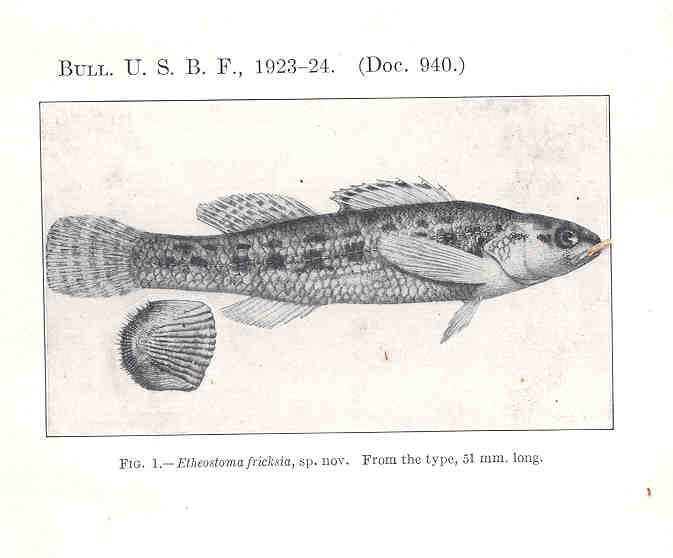

Conservation status
- Least Concern (IUCN 3.1)

Scientific classification
- Kingdom: Animalia
- Phylum: Chordata
- Class: Actinopterygii
- Order: Perciformes
- Family: Percidae
- Genus: Etheostoma
- Species: E. fricksium

Binomial name
- Etheostoma fricksium Hildebrand, 1923

= Savannah darter =

Species of fish

The Savannah darter (Etheostoma fricksium) is a species of freshwater ray-finned fish, a darter from the subfamily Etheostomatinae, part of the family Percidae, which also contains the perches, ruffes and pikeperches. It is endemic to the eastern United States, where it occurs in the Edisto, Combahee, Broad and Savannah River drainages in South Carolina and Georgia. It inhabits gravel riffles, gravel and sand runs of creeks and small rivers. This species can reach a length of 7.4 cm (2.9 in).

== Description ==
Darters have fusiform, cylindrical bodies, large paired fins and poorly developed swim bladders; they rest on the substrate, using their pectoral fins to prop themselves up. The Savannah darter has a maximum total length of 7.4 cm (2.9 in) but a more typical length is 3.5 to 6 cm (1.4 to 2.4 in). Males are usually larger than females, but females are more abundant.

The dorsal fin has 10 or 11 spines and 12 soft rays, the pectoral fin has 13 to 14 rays and the anal fin has 2 spines and 8 to 9 rays. This fish has a small conical head and a broad tan or golden stripe running along the spine, flanked on either side by a dark stripe. This is variable in color and sometimes appears faded, but the pale dorsal stripe is always distinct.

The flanks have eight to twelve dark vertical bars or a series of dark blotches. In breeding males these are separated by reddish streaks while the breeding female's coloring is much more subdued. The front dorsal fin has a narrow dusky green border and a broad red marginal stripe in males and a narrow red stripe in females. The caudal peduncle has a row of three or four, somewhat irregular, dark spots.

== Distribution and habitat ==
The Savannah darter is native to the southeastern United States, where it occurs in South Carolina and Georgia in the Edisto, Combahee, Savannah and Broad River basins, below the fall line. Its typical habitat is in riffles and fast-flowing sections of creeks and small rivers, over sand and gravel substrates, in the vicinity of aquatic vegetation or woody debris, or under overhanging banks.

== Ecology ==
The Savannah darter feeds mainly on aquatic insects, particularly chironomids, but also consumes worms, small molluscs, zooplankton and terrestrial insects. It searches for food among aquatic vegetation and woody debris. Breeding takes place in the spring, when the water temperature is between 11 and 23 °C (52 and 73 °F). The female lays small clutches of sticky eggs which she buries in gravel or sand; the fish become mature before the end of their first year and live for up to three years.

== Status ==
The Savannah darter is a common species and is widespread in the smaller streams of the river basins it inhabits. It is facing no particular threats and the population seems stable. For these reasons, the International Union for Conservation of Nature has assessed its conservation status as being of least concern.
