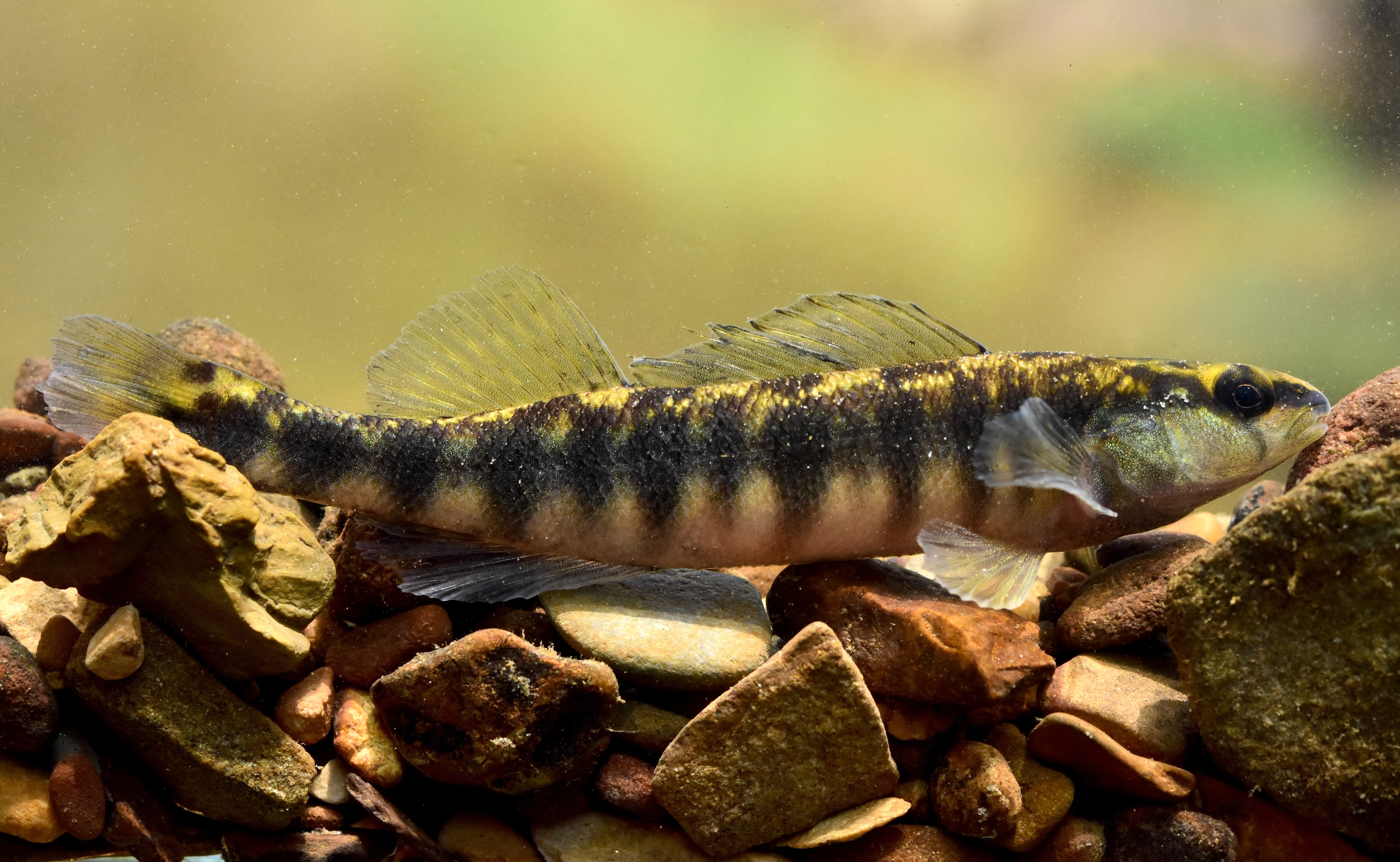

Conservation status
- Least Concern (IUCN 3.1)

Scientific classification
- Kingdom: Animalia
- Phylum: Chordata
- Class: Actinopterygii
- Order: Perciformes
- Family: Percidae
- Genus: Percina
- Species: P. nigrofasciata

Binomial name
- Percina nigrofasciata (Agassiz, 1854

= Blackbanded darter =

Species of fish

The blackbanded darter (Percina nigrofasciata) is a species of freshwater ray-finned fish in the subfamily Etheostomatinae. It is in the family Percidae, which includes the perches, ruffes and pikeperches. It is endemic to the river systems of the Southeastern United States, and occupy headwaters to medium-sized rivers over a sandy or gravelly substrate, often associated with aquatic vegetation. Its color varies depending on the different habitats in which it lives. It feeds on small insect larvae and is itself preyed on by larger fish. It spawns between February and June depending on locality. It is generally a common fish throughout most of its range.

== Description ==
The coloration of the blackbanded darter is variable, often changing to camouflage with the nearby substrate. Breeding males develop a greenish blue coloration during mating season. The blackbanded darter can be confused with the dusky darter (Percina sciera).

== Distribution ==
The blackbanded darter inhabits many river systems in the United States. They are found in the Gulf of Mexico drainage in the southeastern United States (Tennessee, Georgia, Florida, Mississippi, Alabama, and Louisiana). They can be found in the Choctawhatchee in Florida west to the western Mississippi River tributaries in Louisiana. The Halloween darter (Percina crypta) occurs sympatrically with the blackbanded darter throughout the Chattahoochee River.

== Habitat and ecology ==
The blackbanded darter is found in headwaters to medium-sized rivers over gravel and sand substrates. Blackbanded darters tend to live in intermediate microhabitat that has more erosional substrata and greater variety of depth. Blackbanded darters are insectivores and feed on mayflies, midges, blackflies, caddisflies, or anything that is no larger than 5 mm (0.2 in) long. The primary predators for the blackbanded darter are stonecats, largemouth bass, and other larger freshwater fish species.

== Life history ==
The blackbanded darter spawns between February and June. Spawning occurs in sandy bottoms around a stream channel. The male approaches a female from the rear. Once on the female, he mounts her and beats her with his pelvic fin. The average clutch size for the blackbanded darter depends on the location. In Florida, a clutch size range from 4 to 73 eggs, while in Alabama, the range is from 38 to 250 eggs. In Alabama, the sex ratio of the eggs favors male over females. After the eggs are laid, there is no parental care. The life span of the blackbanded darter is estimated to be around three to four years. The life history of the blackbanded darter depends on geographic variation in environmental condition such as photoperiod and water temperature. Pollution and siltation can cause temperature change of the water which will affect when the darter will spawn.

== Management ==
The blackbanded darter is listed as Least Concern by the IUCN and G5 by NatureServe. It is listed as S3 (Vulnerable) in Tennessee. Localized threats may exist, but no major threats are known.
