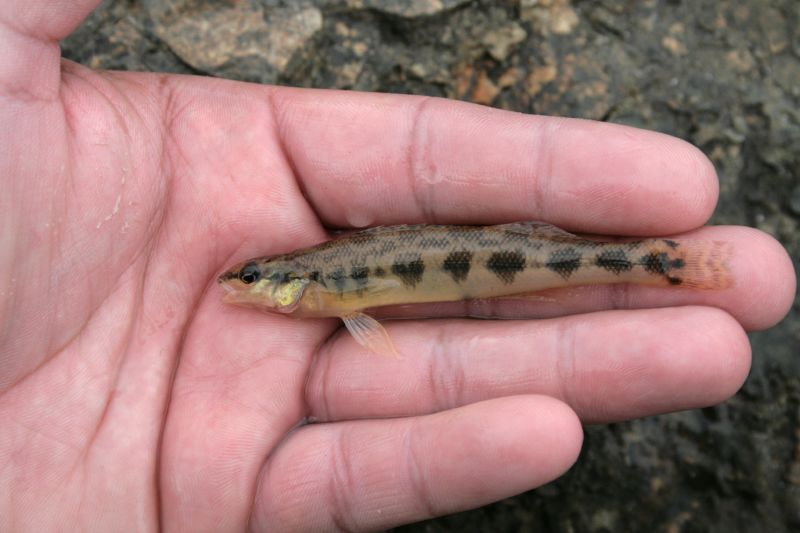

Conservation status
- Least Concern (IUCN 3.1)

Scientific classification
- Kingdom: Animalia
- Phylum: Chordata
- Class: Actinopterygii
- Division: Teleostei
- Order: Perciformes
- Family: Percidae
- Genus: Percina
- Species: P. sciera

Binomial name
- Percina sciera (Swain, 1883)

Synonyms
- Hadropterus scierus Swain, 1883

= Dusky darter =

Species of fish

The dusky darter (Percina sciera) is a species of freshwater ray-finned fish, a darter from the subfamily Etheostomatinae, part of the family Percidae, which also contains the perches, ruffes and pikeperches. It is found in, but not confined to, both large and small rivers, and shallow creeks (1–3rd order), in the eastern, southern, and southeastern United States, particularly the Mississippi River drainage system.

Percina are benthic and benthic-associated fishes. Percina sciera belongs to the family Percidae, which along with Etheostomatinae comprise approximately 20-percent of the recognized diversity in North American freshwater fish. Land development may threaten P. sciera habitat. Percina prefer low water velocity in riffle/pool transition areas primarily on top of woody debris in a sandy/boulder substrate.

== Geographic distribution ==
Percina sciera is considered both a wide-ranging and geographically restricted species that inhabits a variety of freshwater habitats including creeks, streams, rivers as well as lakes and reservoirs in the Mississippi River drainage. P. sciera is found in the eastern United States in areas ranging from the Tennessee Tombigbee waterway, to the unglaciated Allegheny Plateau section of Southern Ohio, to the second and fourth order streams within the Pine Hills of the Mississippi coastal plain. P. sciera has also been studied and monitored in lower Tallahala Creek near its confluence with the Leaf River, which is within the Pascagoula River drainage. Sympatric darter species, including P. sciera, segregate along several resource axes in the Appalachians such as the Elk River, West Virginia, one of several "islands" of fish diversity in the Eastern Highlands of the Mississippi River drainage system.

== Ecology ==
=== Microhabitats ===
Percina sciera microhabitats range from shallow riffles to deep runs and slow pools, with a wide variety of substrates from large boulders to mixtures of sand and gravel. Interspecies interaction, such as with the black-banded darter, Percina nigrofasciata, occurs most often in either the same or adjacent microhabitats; microhabitat displacement is a common outcome of competition. In the Elk River, West Virginia, P. sciera inhabit microhabitats with a low water velocity in the riffle/pool transition areas (mean flow rate of 5.0 cubic centimeters per second at a mean depth of 45.4 cm) primarily on top of small woody debris and sand/boulder substrates, a water velocity typically slower than for Etheostoma.

Temperature and pH requirements are moderate and midrange, respectively, for P. sciera.

=== Diet ===
All species of Percina are carnivorous, most species feeding on aquatic insect larvae such as chironomids (midges), black flies, ephemeropterans (mayflies), and hydropsychids (caddisflies).

In the first few days of feeding, the larval form, referred to as the first-feeding stage, has slow growth due to poorly developed digestive systems, poor nutrient uptake, and lack of predator skills. Small (<.3mm) cladocerans such as Ceriodaphnia and Bosmina are a suitable food source for first-feeding dusky darters, although the quick, erratic movement of calanoid copepods and their long antennae limit the ingestion of first-feeding P. sciera. In laboratory settings, researchers found the dominant prey item for larval P. sciera was Ceriodaphnia; as many as 20 specimens were found in one larval darter. The maximum diameter of prey ingested by larvae was 0.27 to 0.37 mm, which is 70 to 90-percent of the P. sciera larval gape width.

Gut contents of adult P. sciera indicate diets of small, benthic, macroinvertebrates, typically less than five millimeters in length. Compared with other competing species, P. sciera eats more but smaller prey to maintain its metabolism. In the Pascagoula River drainage, P. sciera consume more than three times the volume of small and medium-sized baetid nymphs and small simuliid larvae than similar species such as P. nigrofasciata.

Larger stream fish are more likely to inhabit areas that either maximize energy gain or minimize energy expenditure. Similarly, darter body size is positively correlated with prey size and diet breadth. Adult dusky darters prey on ephemeropteran, plecopteran and odonate nymphs, as well as trichopteran and dipteran larvae. Generally, prey size increases when darter size increases, but small darters tend to have better diets than large darters because of better positioning in relation to the prey-size spectrum.

Feeding ecology and habitat use are the two axes along which Percina exhibit the greatest ecological divergence.

=== Predation ===
P. sciera larvae are vulnerable to predation from cyclopoid copepod. Watersnake predation is a frequent, but relatively poorly known, source of mortality for darters belonging to both Etheostoma and Percina.

== Life history ==
The spawning habits of P. sciera have been studied and propagated in a laboratory setting. P. sciera were reared from eggs to first spawn sexual maturity in a one-year period.

At age one, P. sciera males averaged a total length of 94mm and weighed 7.5 grams, while females averaged 83mm and weighed 4.9g. Age one fish can spawn with the same success as two-year-old fish. P. sciera spawn over fine gravel (1–5mm in diameter) during a photothermal day length of 13-hours and water temperatures approaching 19 °C. Breeding females carry as many as 184 eggs ranging in diameter from 1.65-1.78mm. In one laboratory experiment, 6,372 eggs yielded only 720 Percina sciera larvae. Some darters in the family Percidae have been collected at ages up to four years.

== Current management ==
Nineteen darter species are federally listed as endangered and threatened in the U.S. For example, a related species, the Amber darter (Percina antesella) has struggled due to changes in habitat. Additional darter species are listed by states. P. sciera itself is not federally listed as endangered, despite being extirpated from North Carolina.

The biggest threat to P. sciera involves in-stream physical habitat alterations influenced by human activities, including non-forested land use (agriculture, residential and industrial development), effluent discharge, and water withdrawal. These human activities in the watershed alter stream morphology and increase sediment buildup and temperature, which disrupt the substrate composition in the streambed and can lead to reduced feeding, growth, and reproductive success for P. sciera. Another important stressor is the mixture of roadway surface contaminants that may be toxic to endemic darters and other stream fishes. The United States Environmental Protection Agency concluded that physical habitat alteration represents the greatest potential stressor to fish communities in more than half the streams in the mid-Atlantic Highlands, where some fish communities are in fair or poor condition.

Protecting or conserving critical habitat requires mitigation of anthropogenic effects. For most stream-dwelling fishes, altered stream flood hydrology from increased stormflow runoff is a major source of disturbance. While some flooding is natural, both the frequency and severity of damage may be exacerbated in areas with numerous impervious surfaces (roadways, parking lots, etc.). Surface runoff during storm events can significantly increase stream velocity and alter stream hydrology with channelization and excessive sediment deposits. Stormwater performance standards can set limits on the amount of precipitation that can leave a site as surface runoff, by infiltrating runoff into the soil.

Artificial propagation, although not always effective, may help recovery efforts. A network of pipes, wells, and collection trays (which contain gravel for larvae) has been used as a rearing and spawning area, the photoperiod breeding requirements of darters mimicked with controlled ambient light timer settings, and temperature and pH kept similar to those in the wild.

== Population monitoring ==
P. sciera sampling sites are determined by identifying areas that fit the geomorphology of the species, looking for suitable gradient, substrate, flow and sediment transport, depth, and width. P. sciera populations can be monitored by seining and electrofishing (used to capture the fish for length and weight measurements) and snorkeling (to locate P. sciera). Electroshocking provides one of the best alternatives for obtaining abundance estimates for small nongame fishes, which are not well-suited to mark-recapture techniques.

Gasoline-powered AC electrofishing units consisting of two hand-held electrodes can be used for fish capture. The units typically have one of the two electrodes fitted with a 4-mm mesh/nylon net to enable the operator to capture fish, which is usually done in an upstream manner. Sites sampled should be divided into 100 m sections that have block nets placed at the upper and lower ends of the site to restrict immigration and emigration. A stationary seine (4.6 m wide and 1.2 m tall) can be used in conjunction with the electroshocking technique when kept downstream of the individual(s) shocking.

A typical sampling crew consists of four people: two seine holders, an electroshocking operator, and a person either kicking into the seine or assisting with the seine in strong flow. When searching for P. sciera, snorkelers, who should never be in the water while electrofishing is underway, begin at the downstream end of the site and slowly proceeded upstream in a random zig-zag direction to observe as much area as possible in expansive shoals, riffles, and runs.

== Additional sources ==
Cavender, T.M., and Rice, D.L. 1997. Survey and analysis of the Scioto Brush Creek drainage fish fauna of Southern Ohio. Ohio Journal of Science 97:78-85.

Labay, A.A., Collins, K., Standage, R.W., and Brandt, T.M. 2004. Gut content of first-feeding wild darters and captive-reared dusky darters. North American Journal of Aquaculture 66:153-157.

Labay, A.A., Standage, R.W., and Brandt, T.M. 2004. Selected methods for dusky darter captive propagation. North American Journal of Aquaculture 66:146-152.

Miller, G.L. 1983. Trophic Resource-allocation between Percina sciera and Percina-ouachitae in the Tombigbee River, Mississippi. American Midland Naturalist 110:299-313.

Rakocinski, C. 1991. Prey-size relationships and feeding tactics of primitive stream-dwelling darters. Canadian Journal of Fisheries and Aquatic Sciences 48:681-693.
