= TusPark (Nanjing) =

Industrial park in Nanjing, China

Tuspark Nanjing or Tsinghua University Science Park Nanjing (Tuspark (Nanjing) Development Co. Ltd.) is a Chinese high-tech office park next to the Nine Dragon Lake, between Nanjing CBD and Nanjing Airport in Jiangning District of Nanjing, China. It is the Nanjing Branch of TusPark, the world's largest university science and technology park.

Tuspark has 30 branches all around China. About 400 companies and 25,000 employees work in Tuspark complexes. The most famous is the Tsinghua Science Park, which is next to the Tsinghua University. In Nanjing, Tuspark owns three office areas with a total space of 233.000m². The total investment is 1 billion RMB. The green ratio of the Tuspark Nanjing green is 3.4 / 35.08%. 80% of the offices has lake view. The workers and researchers deal with equipment manufacturing, software and outsourcing, animation, new energy, and bio-medicine. The coupling of industry and research centers creates an innovative platform for industrial developments. The Jiangning Development Zone is one of the most innovative area in the Yangtze River Delta.

The Nanjing Science and Technology Park's opening ceremony was held near the Jiulong Lake with the Jiangsu Provincial Standing Committee and TusPark founder and president Mei Meng, TusPark CEO Xu Jinghong, party secretary Zhu Shanlu, Kang KeJun, Shi ZongKai, Rong Yonglin, Wang Yonghong, Li Qi, Bai Peng, Lu Jiechao, Yang Yulin were in attendance.

== TusParks in China ==
- Tuspark (Beijing)
- Tuspark (Caofeidian)
- TusPark (Cixi)
- TusPark (Hebei)
- TusPark (Guanlin)
- TusPark (Shenyang)
- TusPark (Jiangxi)
- TusPark (Kunshan)
- TusPark (Nanjing)
- TusPark (Shaanxhi) or TusPark (Shanxi)
- TusPark (Shanghai) or (Shanghai Multimedia Valley)
- TusPark (Shunyi)
- TusPark (Suizhong)
- TusPark (Haian)
- TusPark (Huigu)
- TusPark (Hebei)
- TusPark (Weihai)
- TusPark (Zhuhai)
- TusPark (Yangzhou)
- TusPark (Yuquanhuigu)
- TusPark (Weihai)
