= Jiedaibao =

Jiedabao
- Company type: Private company
- Industry: Finance
- Founded: 2014
- Headquarters: Beijing, China
- Area served: China
- Key people: Wu Gang (President)
- Website: jiedaibao.com

Jiedaibao (Chinese: 借贷宝; lit. 'borrowing treasure') is a Chinese peer-to-peer platform for borrowing and lending money. The platform is operated by Renrenxing Technology Co., Ltd. It provides matching, registration, collection and other services for small loans. Jiedaibao users borrow or lend independently, at their own risk. Jiedaibao does not promise or guarantee the recovery of principal or interest for creditors.

Jiedaibao opened itself up in 2016 to third-party, freelance debt collectors. After uploading a photo and submitting an ID number, individuals can register themselves as collectors of debts owed to other users of the service. These debt collectors can then receive contact information of overdue debtors, including phone numbers and addresses, in the hopes of being able to collect outstanding debts in exchange for a commission fee.

In 2016, reports surfaced that some lenders on the site were demanding that certain users collateralize loans with nude photos of themselves, which would be released online in the event of a default.

Jiedaibao is one of China's top tech unicorns, with an estimated valuation of over US$10 billion. The company is headquartered in Zhongguancun, Beijing, China.
