= Haidian Christian Church =

Church building in Beijing, China

Coordinates: 39.983305°N 116.307484°E

- Simplified Chinese: 北京基督教会海淀堂
- Traditional Chinese: 北京基督教會海澱堂
Transcriptions
Standard Mandarin
- Hanyu Pinyin: Běijīng Jīdūjiào Huì Hǎidiàn Táng
- Wade–Giles: Pei3-ching1 Chi1-tu1-chiao4 Hui4 Hai3-tian4 T'ang2

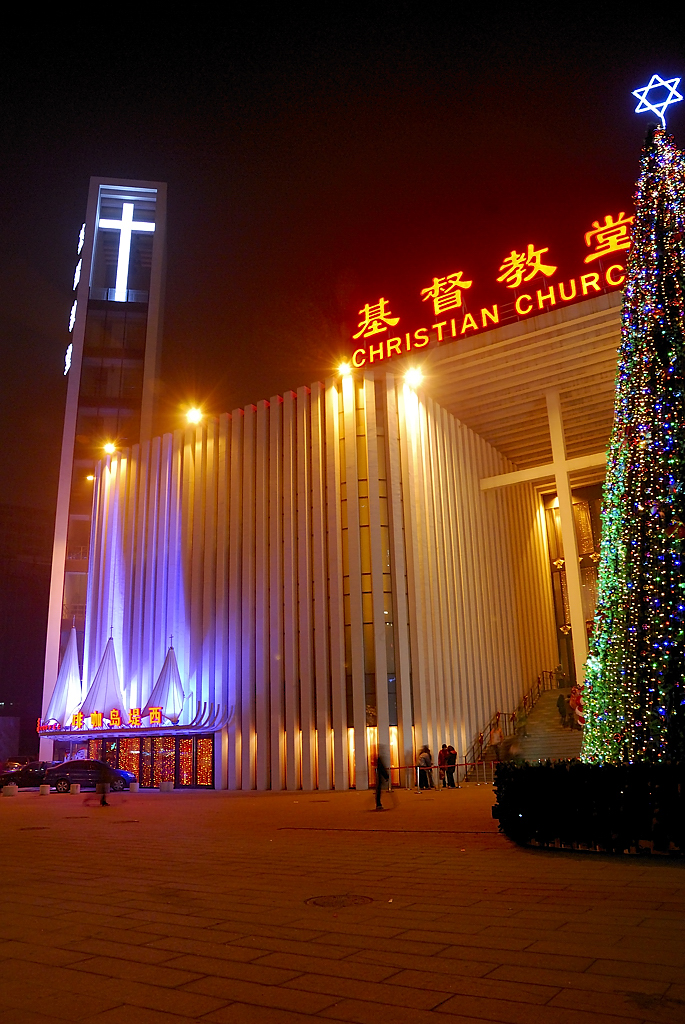
Haidian Christian Church during 2007 Christmas

Haidian Christian Church (Chinese: 北京基督教会海淀堂) is a church located in Zhongguancun, Haidian District, Beijing, People's Republic of China. It is operated by the Three-Self Patriotic Movement, a state-registered Protestant Church in Mainland China. It was opened in 1933 by the Evangelical Church and was later closed and reopened under Chinese state control.

== History ==
The church was founded in 1933 as "Haidian Gospel Church" by the Evangelical Church. During the Second Sino-Japanese War, Chinese women would hide in the church from invading Japanese soldiers. Haidian Christian Church was forced to close in 1958 by the Communist authorities but it was reopened in 1985 under the new reform and opening up government policy as a part of the Three-Self Patriotic Movement.

The pastor of the church, Wu Weiqing, graduated from Nanjing Union Theological Seminary in 1989 and has a DMin from Fuller Theological Seminary. He speaks English fluently as the church holds services in both English and Mandarin. In 2016, Haidian Church established its first church planting with the establishment of Beijing Vineyard Church nearby on their campus.

== Architecture ==
This design for the largest Christian church in China is characterized by a Chinese type of "triple p", meaning public-private partnership with commercial spaces on the ground floor, and by its striking facade rod system.

— Gerkan, Marg and Partners

The original 1933 building was demolished in order for it to be renovated. The current church building was designed by Meinhard von Gerkan and Stephan Schütz of Gerkan, Marg and Partners from 2005 to 2007 for €3.5 million with it being reopened in 2007. It has a gross floor area of 4,000 square metres (43,000 sq ft).

== Congregation ==
Haidian Christian Church is located near Tsinghua University, Peking University and numerous IT company headquarters such as Sina.com in China's technology hub. As such, a large percentage of attendants are young. As a state-run church, the Chinese Communist Party government appoints the priests to minister within it.
