= Tuspark =

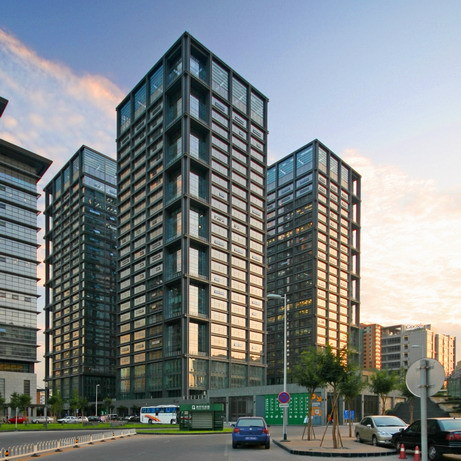
Wudaokou branch

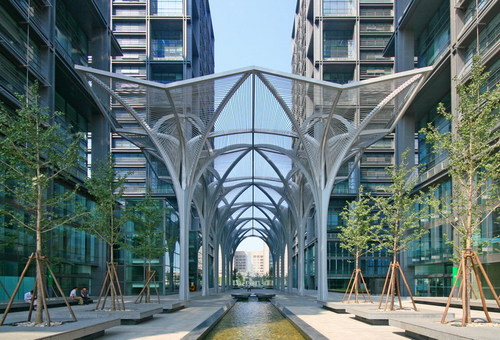
Wudaokou branch

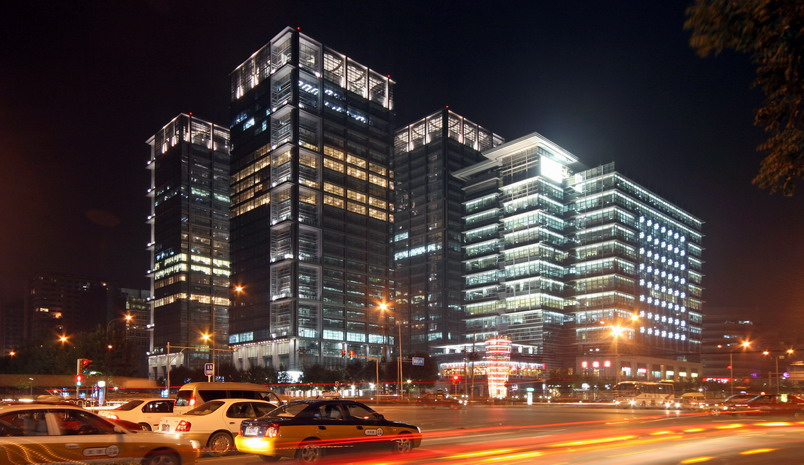
Wudaokou branch

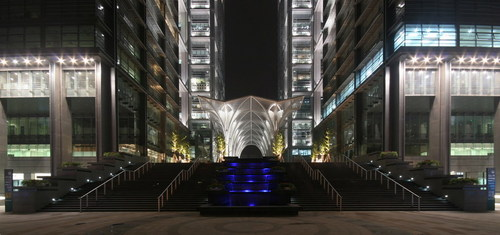
Wudaokou branch

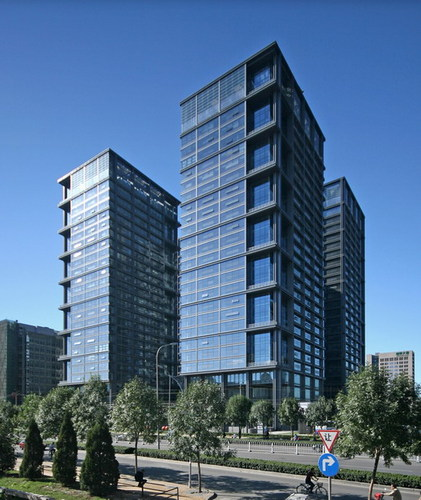
Wudaokou branch

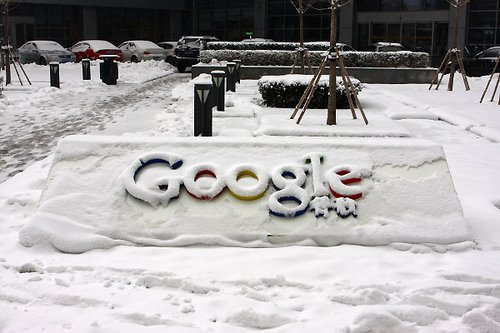
Outside of Google China's Wudaokou office in winter

The Tuspark or Tsinghua University Science Park, Tuspark Holding Limited is a Chinese high-tech company which builds business parks. It has buildings in Zhongguancun of Beijing, in Kunshan, Suzhou, Jiangsu and in Nanjing. It has 30 branches all around China. About 400 companies and 25000 employees are working in Tuspark. The original branch is based just south-west next to the East Gate of the main campus of Tsinghua University in Wudaokou.

Tuspark, which is an abbreviation of the Tsinghua University Science Park, was set up in 1994, the first building, the TusPark Development Center was built in 1998.

The TusPark's founder and President is Mei Meng, the senior vice-president is Chen Hongbo, who is the vice-dean of the Tsinghua University. The Tuspark's CEO is Xu Jinghong.

== Companies ==
More than 200 companies are local ventures, like Viador, Achivo, Visionox, Hansky with a variety of science fields. For example, they have incubation Systems: bio and life science, software, IC design, digital TV, 3G mobile communication. In Beijing Microsoft, Sohu, Google Beijing, Sun Microsystems, msn.cn, Schlumberger, P&G, Toyota, NEC belong to the Tsinghua University Science Park. Google Beijing had 1200 square meters first, later the company extended it to 13888 square meters, 350 employees were working for the Google Beijing in 2007. In 2006 the total park had 690,000 square meters with 20 buildings there.

== Locations ==
=== TusParks in China ===
- TusPark (Haian)
- Tuspark (Caofeidian)
- TusPark (Cixi)
- TusPark (Hebei)
- TusPark (Guanlin)
- TusPark (Shenyang)
- TusPark (Jiangxi)
- TusPark (Kunshan)
- TusPark (Nanjing)
- TusPark (Shaanxhi) or TusPark (Shanxi)
- TusPark (Shanghai) or (Shanghai Multimedia Valley)
- TusPark (Shunyi)
- TusPark (Suizhong)
- TusPark (Huigu)
- TusPark (Hebei)
- TusPark (Weihai)
- TusPark (Zhuhai)
- TusPark (Yangzhou)
- TusPark (Yuquanhuigu)
- TusPark (Weihai)

=== TusParks in Hong Kong ===
Tuspark Hong Kong has three locations in Kwun Tong, Central and Causeway Bay.

=== TusStar ===
TusStar Incubator is an innovation and entrepreneurship platform originated from TusPark which pioneers the incubator projects.

==== TusStar Malaysia ====
TusStar Malaysia is a joint venture between Tus Holdings and Brunsfield International.

=== Other Science parks in China ===
There were 62 Science Parks based on 122 universities with 0.2 million employees in the PRC. The total investments of these science parks are 30 billion RMB.

== See also ==
- Sinovel
- Digital China
- Cernet
- Chengzhi Shareholding Co
- Citic
- Bank of China
- Tsinghua Tongfang
- Thunis
- China Merchants Bank
- Sun China
- Tsinghua Solar
