= Subate =

Town in Augšdaugava Municipality, Latvia

- Town
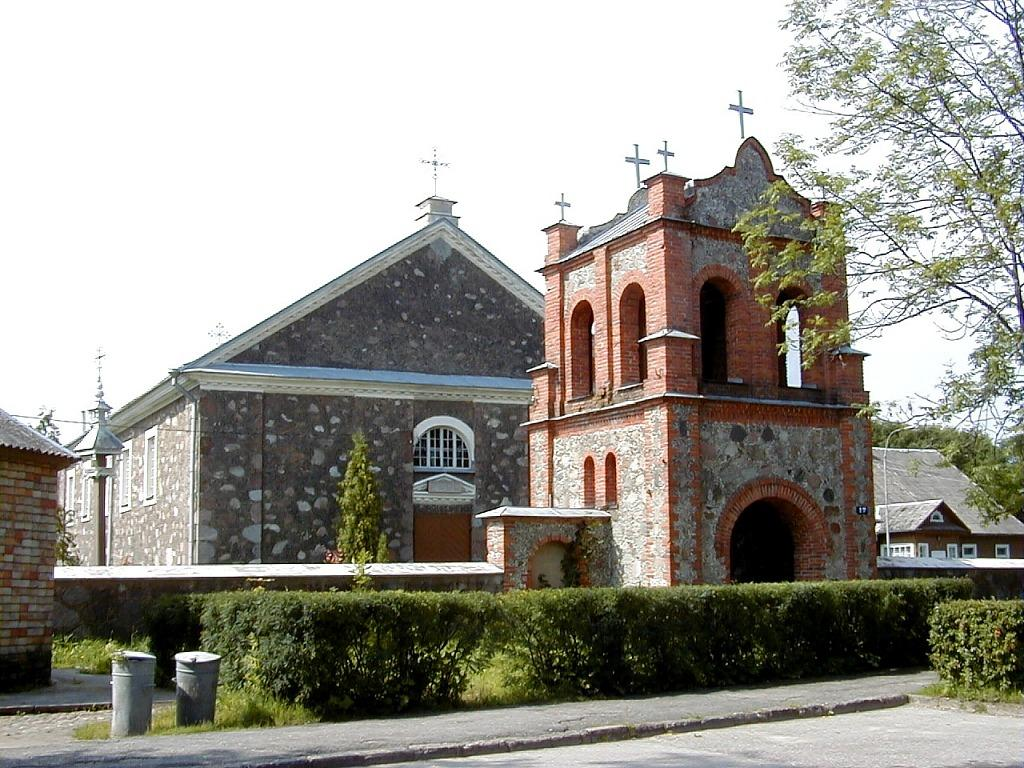
- Subate Saint Michael Roman Catholic Church

- Coat of arms

- Location in Latvia
- Coordinates: 56°01′N 25°54′E
- Country: Latvia
- Municipality: Augšdaugava Municipality
- Town rights: 1917

Area
  - Total: 5.32 km^{2} (2.05 sq mi)
  - Land: 4.58 km^{2} (1.77 sq mi)
  - Water: 0.74 km^{2} (0.29 sq mi)

Population (2026)
  - Total: 504
  - Density: 110/km^{2} (285/sq mi)
- Time zone: UTC+2 (EET)
  - Summer (DST): UTC+3 (EEST)
- Postal code: LV-5471
- Calling code: +371 654
- Website: http://www.subate.lv/

Subate (Lithuanian: Subatė, Subačius, German: Subbath) is a town in Augšdaugava Municipality in the Selonia region of Latvia, near the border with Lithuania. Subate is located 40 km west of Daugavpils. The population in 2020 was 596.

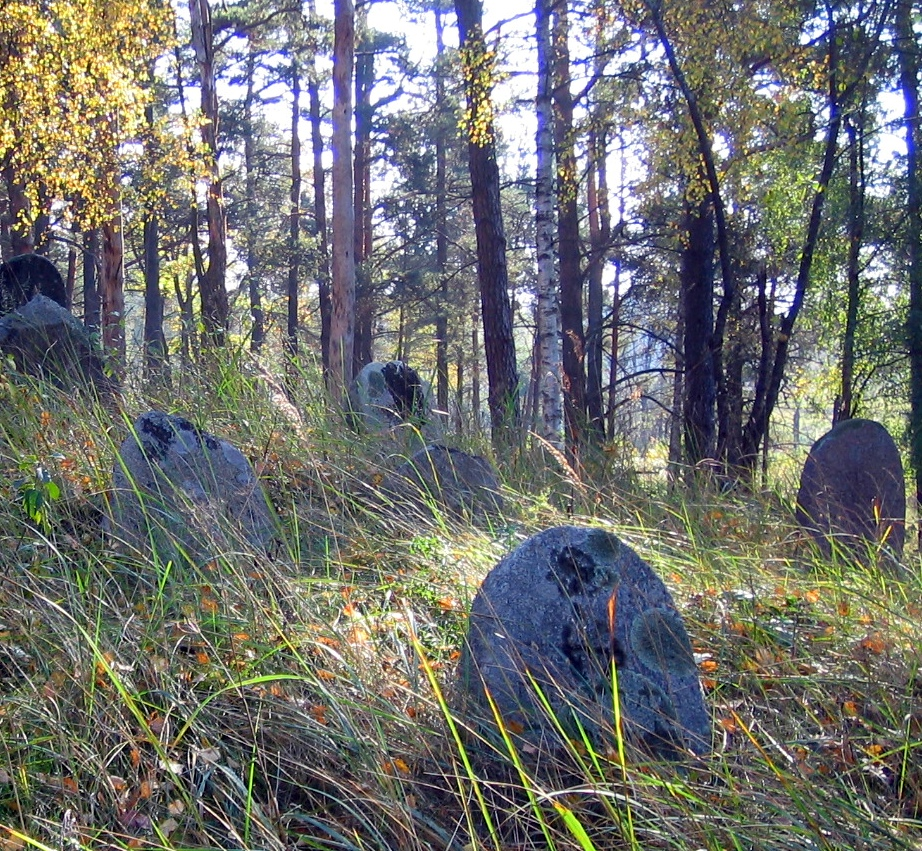
The Old Jewish Cemetery in Subate

In 1570 Gotthard Kettler, the first Duke of Courland and Semigallia, granted the Baltic German Plater family, the dominant nobles throughout southeastern Latvia, an estate at the lake of Subate, and Alt-Subbath (Old Subbath) was established. After the Counter-Reformation, the Plater-Sybergs (Polish: Plater-Zyberk) converted to Catholicism, founding a mission with the intention of converting their serfs, and the Lutherans moved across the lake in protest, creating Neu-Subbath (New Subbath); the two towns were joined in 1894. By the late 19th century Jews composed about half of the population, and in 1914 there were ca. 2300 inhabitants. The town traded primarily in Lithuanian flax, but this trade languished after World War I. Almost all of Subate's Jews were brutally murdered in the Stahlecker phase of the Holocaust in 1941.

== People ==
- Armin von Gerkan (1885–1964), German archaeologist

== Gallery ==
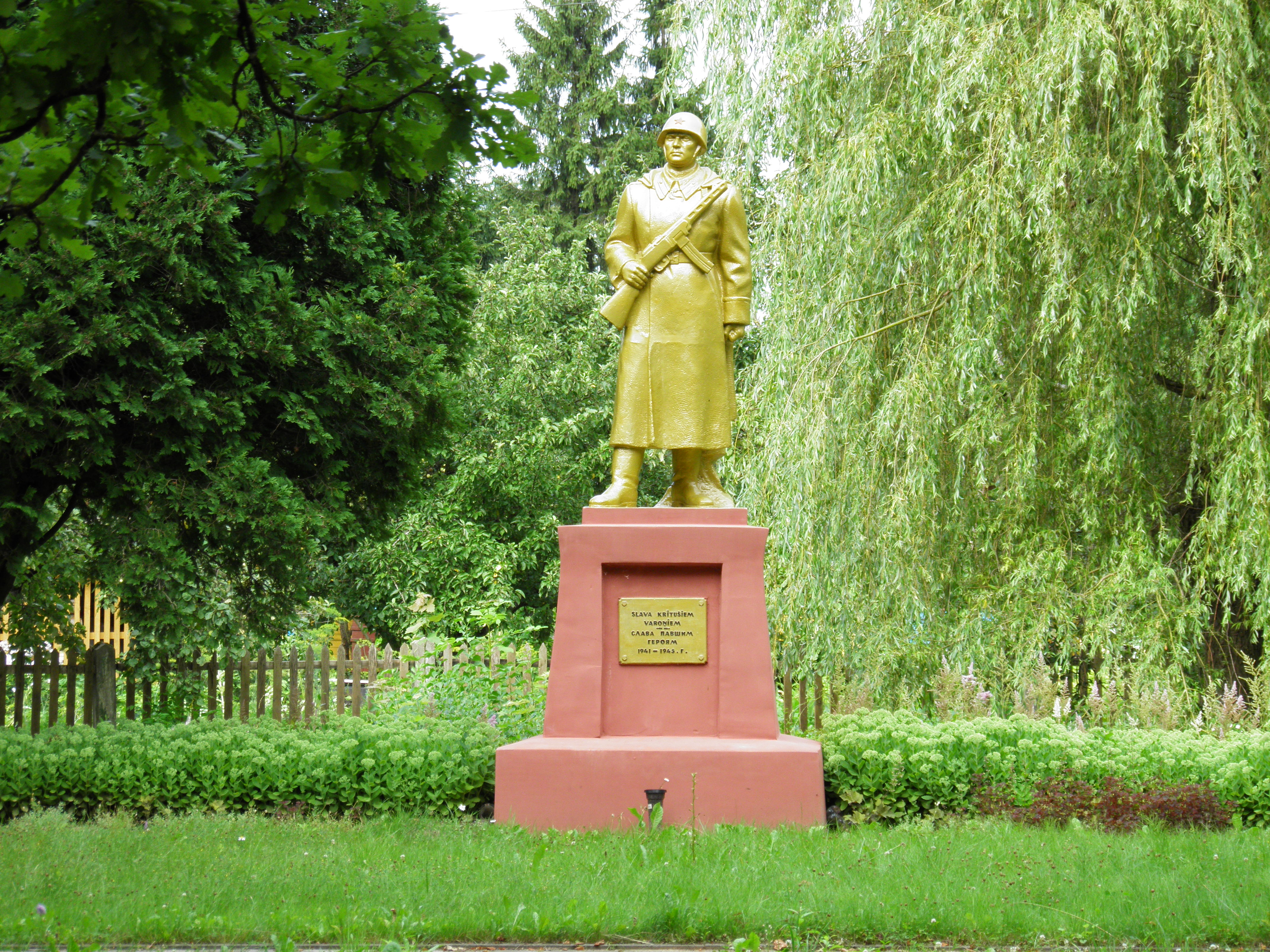
Monument to soviet soldiers in Subate

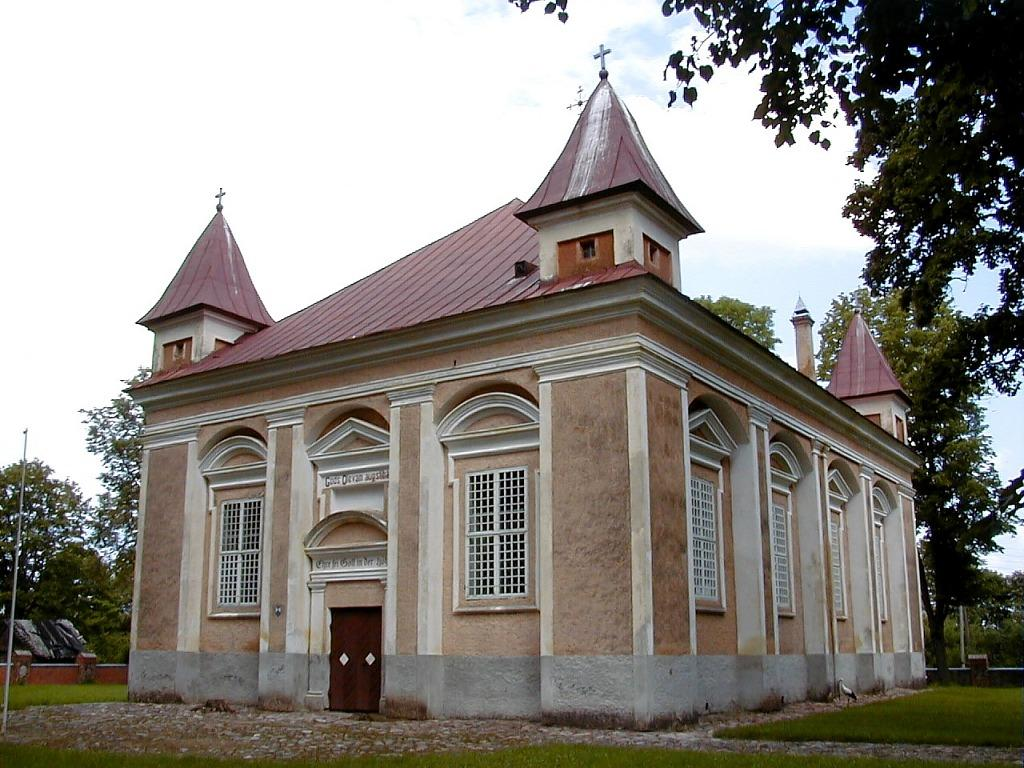
Lutheran church

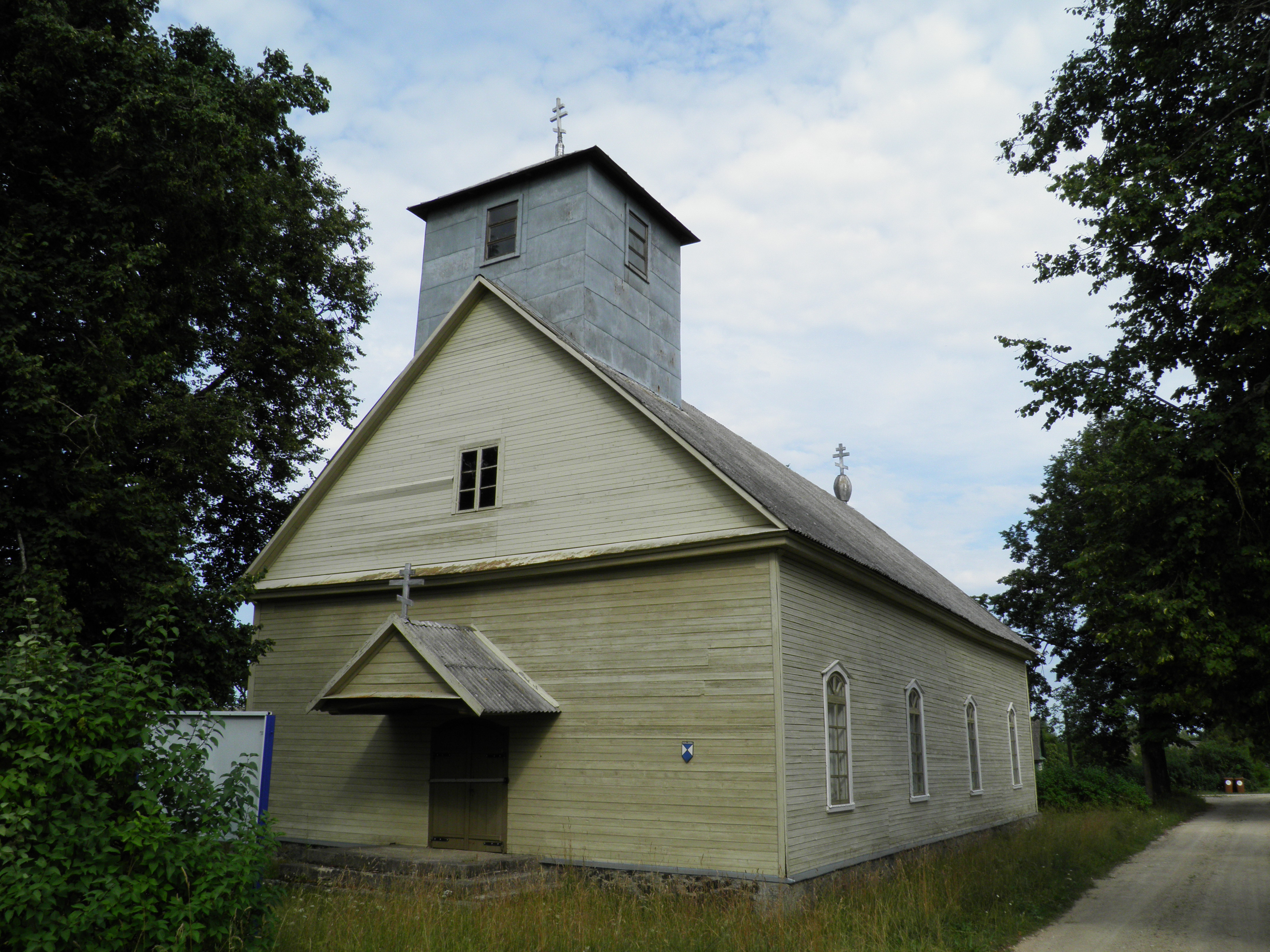
Old believers church in Subate
