= Zhongguancun Administrative Committee =

Local government committee in Beijing, China

The Zhongguancun Administrative Committee is a committee which oversees the affairs of Zhongguancun, Beijing.
