= Armin von Gerkan =

Baltic German classical archaeologist (1885–1969)

Armin von Gerkan (November 30, 1885 in Subate, Courland Governorate – December 22, 1969 in Garstedt, present Norderstedt, Germany) was a Baltic German classical archaeologist and member of an aristocratic family. He was an expert for archaeological building research and joint founder of Robert Johann Koldewey Society (Koldewey-Gesellschaft e.V.) in Berlin. Gerkan is a seminal figure in ancient architectural history. His report "Griechische Stadtanlagen" (1924) is still consulted today as a basic text for ancient city planning, and his methodology has been widely adopted.

Architect Meinhard von Gerkan (born 1935 Riga) was a relative of his.

== Sources ==
- Biography at the Dictionary of Art Historians
- German Bibliography
