= Zhabei =

Historical district of Shanghai, China

Coordinates: 31.2522°N 121.459°E

Zhabei 闸北
- District of China
- 1945–2015
- Location of Zhabei in Shanghai.
- Area
- 29.26 km^{2} (11.30 sq mi)
- History
  - Established: 1945
  - Disestablished: 4 November 2015
Succeeded by
Jing'an District
- Today part of: Part of the Jing'an District, Shanghai

Zhabei
- Simplified Chinese: 闸北
- Traditional Chinese: 閘北
- Wu: Zahpoh
- Postal: 200070
Transcriptions
Standard Mandarin
- Hanyu Pinyin: Zháběi
- Wade–Giles: Chapei
Wu
- Romanization: Zahpoh

Zhabei, formerly romanized as Chapei, is a neighborhood and a former district of Shanghai with a land area of 29.26 km^{2} (11.30 sq mi) and a resident population of 847,300 as of 2013. It is the location of the Shanghai railway station, one of the main railway stations of Shanghai. On November 4, 2015, Zhabei was merged into the smaller but more central Jing'an District.

Historically, the district has been highly populated with working class residents. However, due to the shift in the structure of industries and increasing number of immigrants from outside Shanghai, partly due to its reasonable real estate price (compared to its counterparts such as Putuo and Hongkou), the district has become increasingly appealing to city residents.

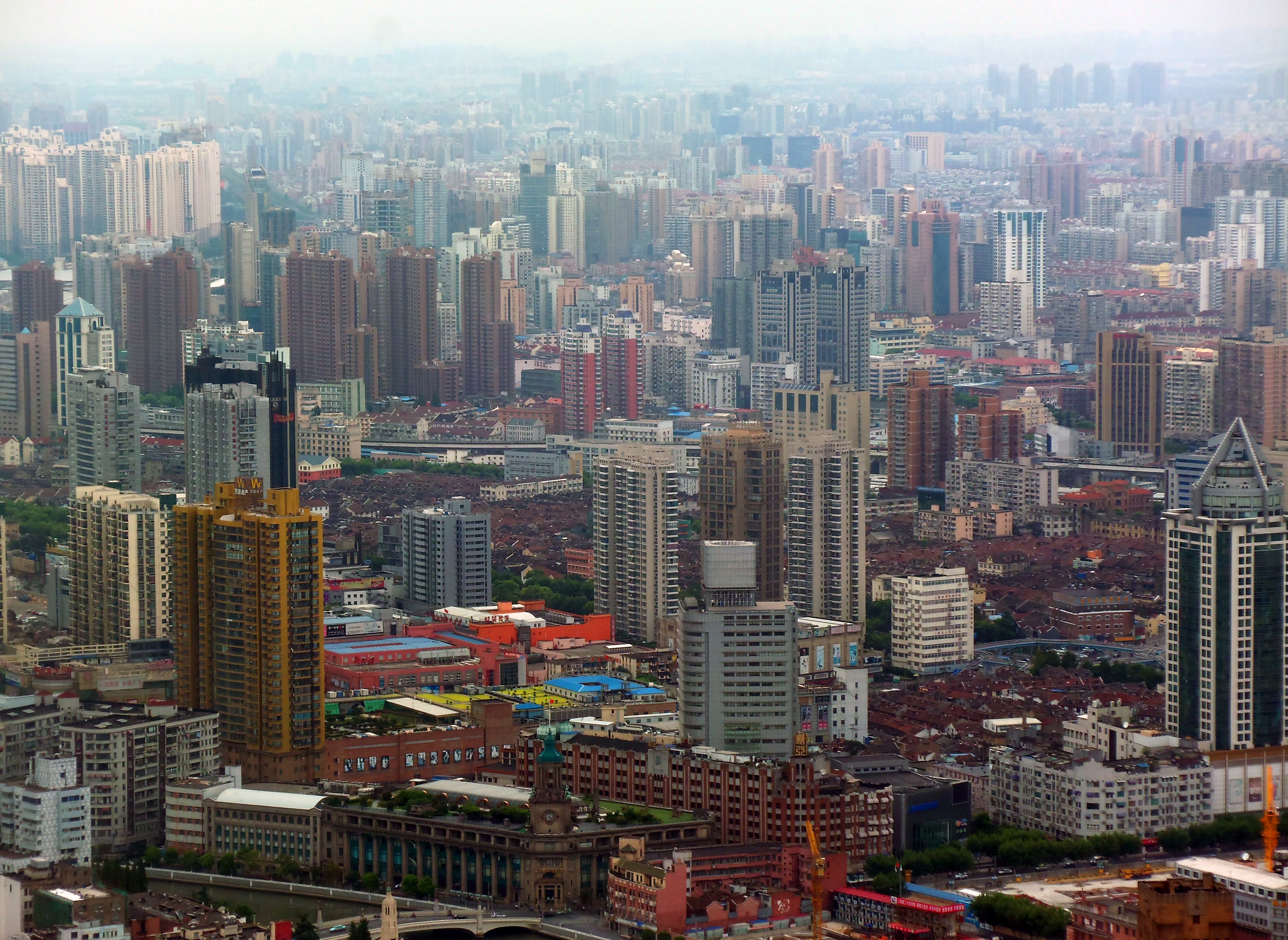
Lower Zhabei from Oriental Pearl Tower

== Economy ==
Zhabei local authorities have developed business and commercial centres in the district. It has attracted various foreign companies to build offices, apartments and commercial retail outlets over there.

It is also where the Shanghai Multimedia Valley (SMV) is located to attract media and IT talent. Major companies located in Zhabei include TÜV Rheinland, Royal Philips Electronics and Shanghai Bell Alcatel Business Systems Co., LTD.

China Resources Beverage, the distributor of C'estbon water, has its east China regional office on the twentieth floor of the Huanzhi International Building (环智国际大厦) in the district.

The League of Legends Pro League, (LPL) the highest level of professional League of Legends in Mainland China, is played in the Shanghai Electric Industrial Park in Zhabei District.

== Facilities ==
Zhabei District used to be the place of agglomeration of traditional industries such as flavor factory and tires factory. In the last decade, the municipality decided to move the old industry out in order to make space for more promising ones such as the hi-tech and creative industries.

Daning Lingshi Park, the biggest green area in the downtown area, is surrounded by a series of cultural facilities such as the Zhabei Stadium and Shanghai Circus World.

The Shanghai University, Yanchang Campus is also located near the Daning Lingshi Park.
