= Swissôtel Berlin =

Closed luxury hotel in Berlin, Germany

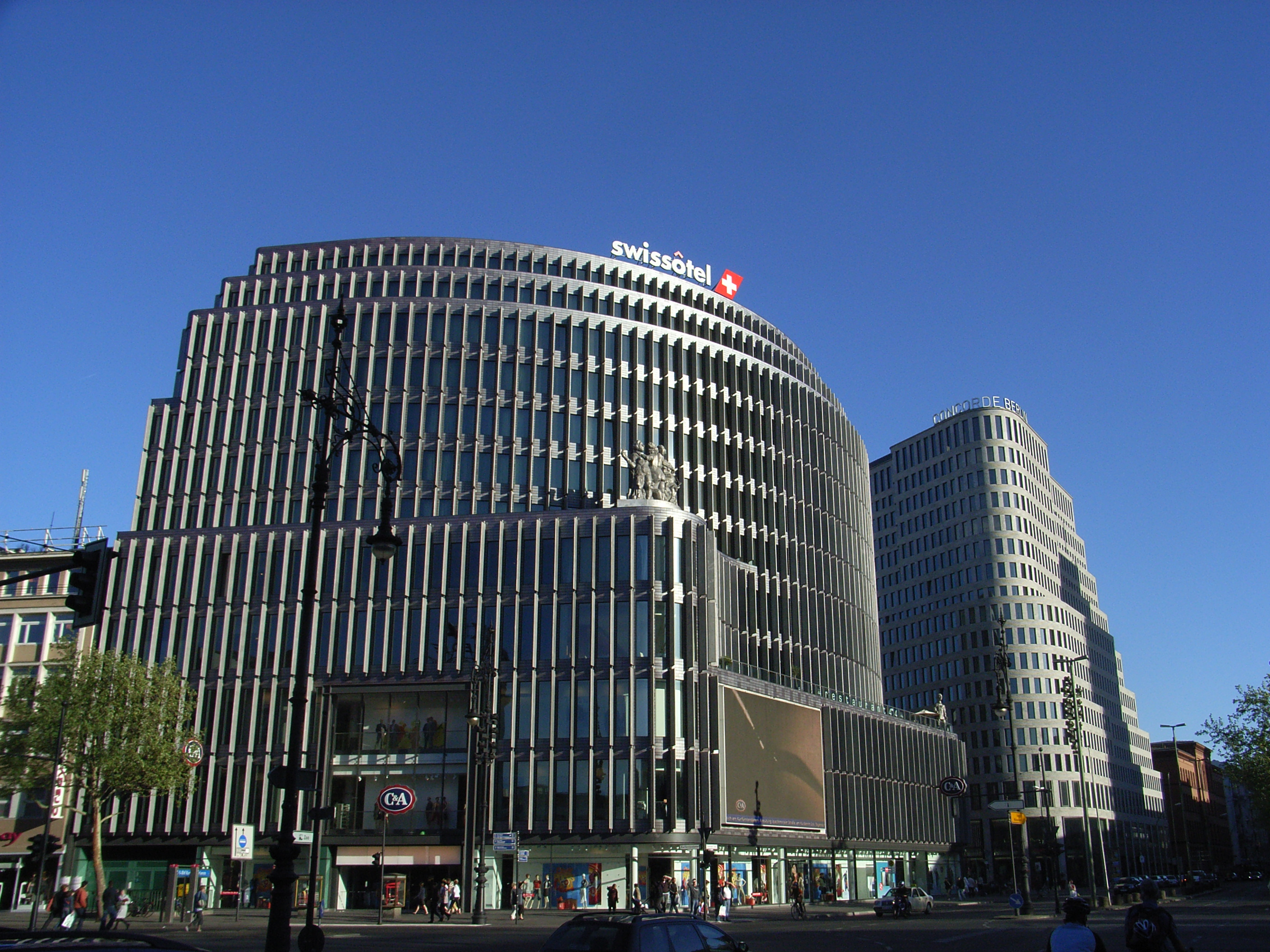
- Swissôtel Berlin, seen from Kurfürstendamm

- Location within Berlin

General information
- Status: Closed
- Location: Augsburger Strasse 44; 10789 Berlin; Germany
- Coordinates: 52°30′11.847″N 13°19′54.1236″E
- Opening: 21 August 2001
- Management: Swissôtel Hotels & Resorts

Height
- Height: 45 metres (148 ft)

Design and construction
- Architect: Gerkan, Marg and Partners

Other information
- Number of rooms: 318
- Number of restaurants: 1

Website
- www.swissotel.com

The Swissôtel Berlin was a luxury hotel in Berlin, Germany. The hotel overlooked the crossing of the Kurfürstendamm shopping avenue with Joachimstaler Straße, in the city's Charlottenburg quarter. Both the Zoo railway station and Kurfürstendamm U-Bahn station were nearby. As well as hotel and conference facilities, the hotel included Restaurant 44, which features Swiss cuisine and overlooks the Kurfürstendamm, as well as the Palermo bar and the Grande Gallerie cafe.

The hotel won two awards, the 2008 Germany's Leading Business Hotel and the 2007 Germany's Leading Conference Hotel. It was managed by Swissôtel Hotels & Resorts, which is part of the FRHI Hotels & Resorts group.

== History ==
In early 1991, the Hamburg architects Gerkan, Marg and Partners were retained to draw up a plan for the new Swissôtel Berlin and the commerce building, which led to a pre-notification in 1993. A number of versions with solutions for different unitizations were developed between 1995 and 1998. These plans coordinated between the Charlottenburg district office of Berlin, the building owner, and the architects. The planning and building permissions were finally received at the end of 1998. The hotel was under construction from August 1998 until 2001 and opened on 21 August 2001.

In October 2013, the hotel received a facelift of the public areas.

The hotel closed in November 2018 to be redeveloped as offices and business center.

== Architecture and artwork ==
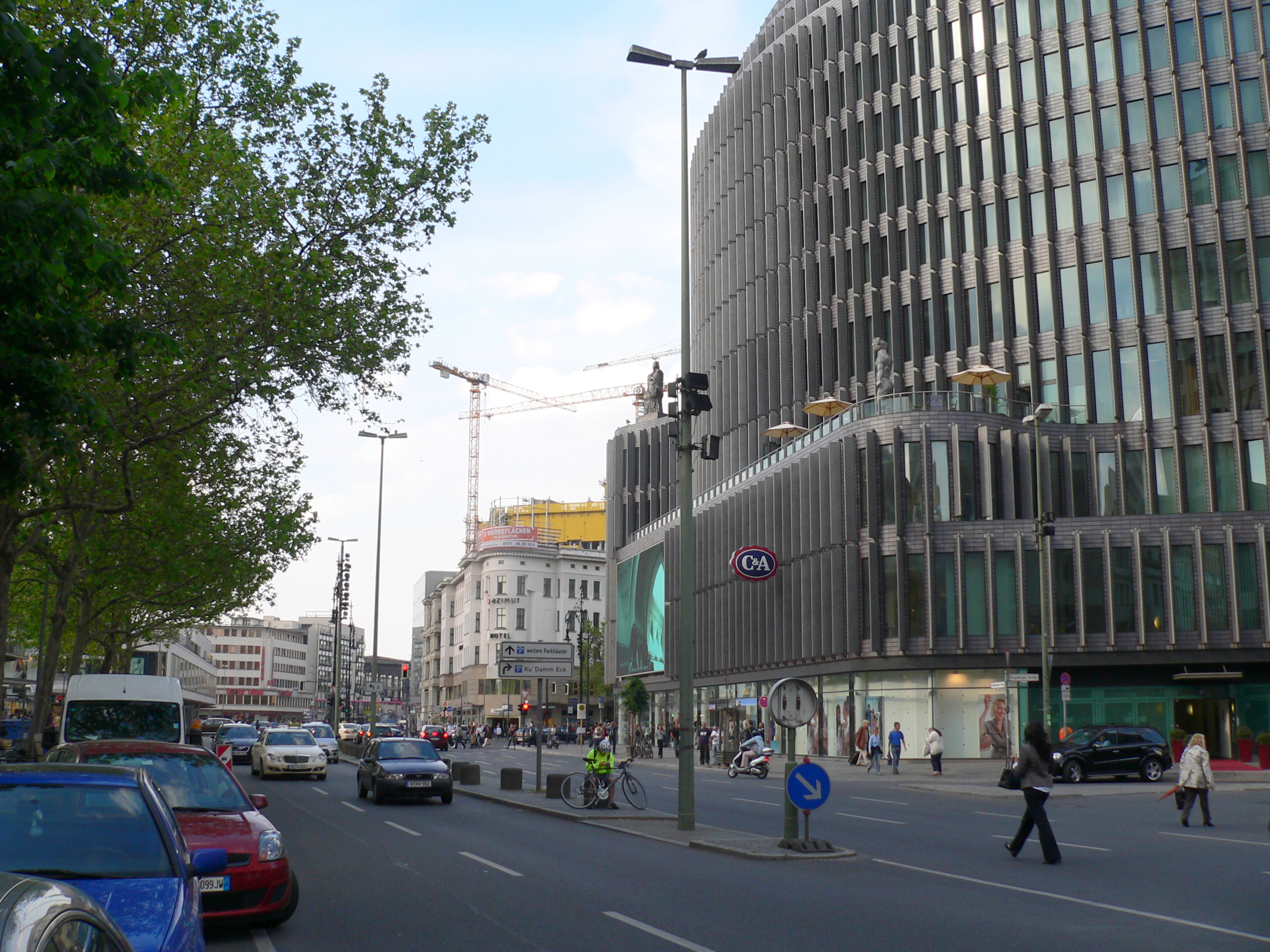
The hotel seen from Joachimstaler Straße, with the hotel entrance indicated by the red carpet.

The building is 45 metres (148 ft) high and has a 70 square metres (750 sq ft) video screen outside the hotel, facing Kurfürstendamm. The lower three floors of the building are occupied by a branch of the fashion retailer C&A, with the hotel above. The hotel's street level entrance hall faced Augsberger Strasse at its junction with Joachimstaler Straße and had a height of 11 metres (36 ft). Dedicated elevators linked this hall with the hotel lobby, which was located on the third floor above ground level. Meeting rooms, restaurants and bars opened off and surrounded the hotel lobby, which was two storeys tall and was lit by a glazed roof.

The hotel's 316 rooms were located on the fourth to tenth floors, and were accessed by a separate bank of elevators from the hotel lobby. The rooms surrounded an interior courtyard, which was floored by the glazed roof over the lobby.

Swissôtel Berlin had an art gallery with changing exhibitions, and each of the 316 guestrooms feature the art of Markus Lüpertz, one of the best known German artists. His group sculptures The Judgement of Paris and Three Grazies are found in the hotel hallways, and the main sculpture Paris is in the restaurant terrace.
