= Dinghao Market =

Major electronics market in Zhongguancun, Beijing

Coordinates: 39.9839°N 116.3143°E

- 鼎好电子商城
- Interactive map of the Dinghao Market area
- Alternative names: ETopone Electronics Plaza; Ding Hao Market; Top Electronics City

General information
- Location: Zhongguancun, Haidian District, China

Technical details
- Floor area: 100,000 m^{2}

Dinghao Market is one of five major electronics markets in Zhongguancun, Beijing.

== History ==
Li Zhongjin is the current chief business officer of Dinghao Market.

Dinghao Market is home to Lenovo's flagship store and Starbucks 1000th milestone Asian location.

== See also ==
- Guigu Market
- Hailong Market
- Kemao Market
- Taipingyang Market
