= Kemao Market =

Major electronics market in Zhongguancun, Beijing

- 科贸电子城
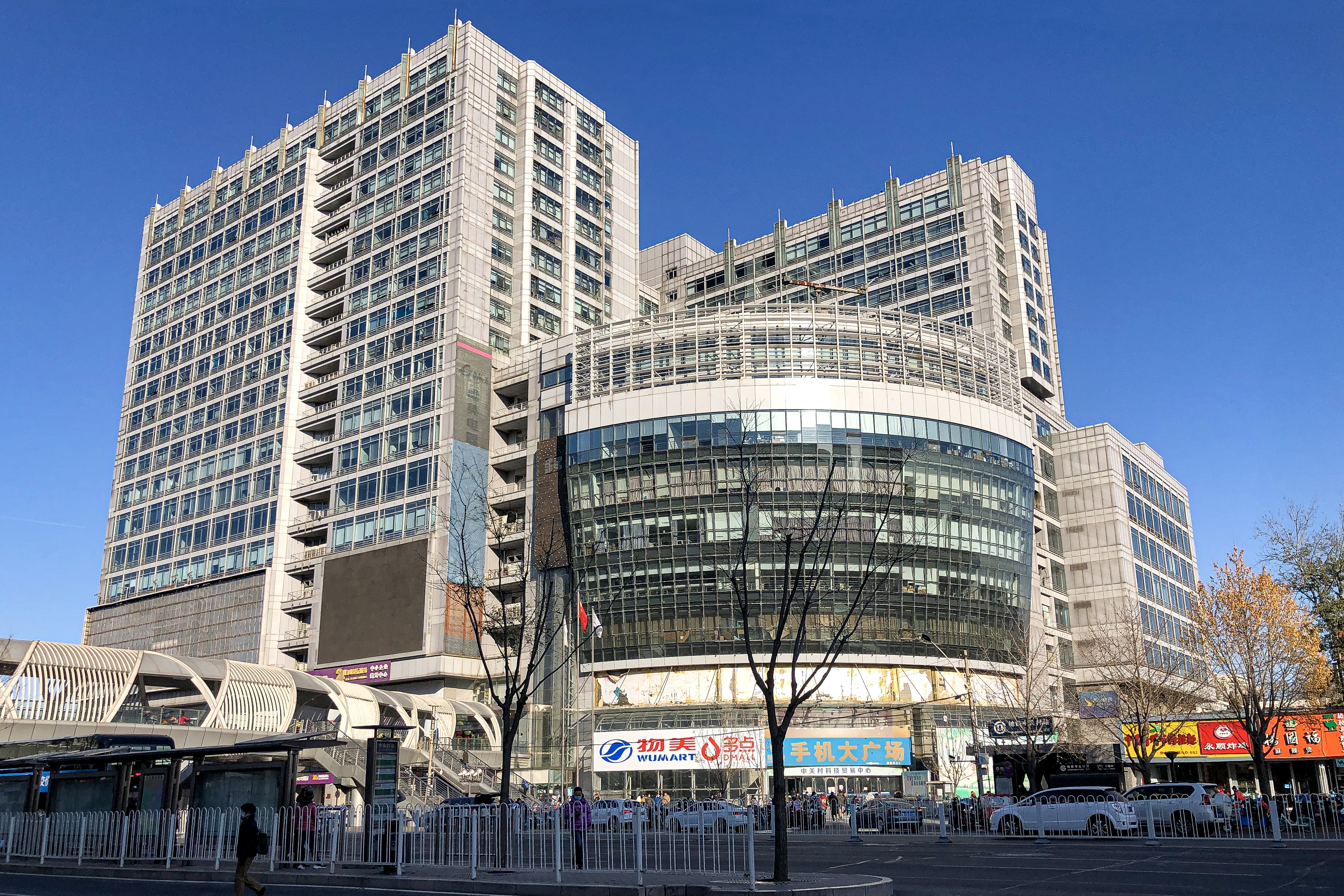
- Alternative names: Kemao Computer Market; Kemao Electronic City; Kemao Electronics Mall; Kemao Electronics Market; Kemao Electronics Plaza

General information
- Location: Zhongguancun, 18 Zhongguancun St, Haidian District, China

Technical details
- Floor count: 24
- Floor area: 75,000 m^{2}

Website
- www.zgccomo.com

Kemao Market is one of five major electronics markets in Zhongguancun, Beijing.

== History ==
Kemao Market opened its doors on February 21, 2004. The building is rated 5A-class and features a four-star hotel.

== See also ==
- Dinghao Market
- Hailong Market
