= Hailong Market =

Major electronics market in Zhongguancun, Beijing

Coordinates: 39.9833°N 116.3154°E

- 海龙大厦
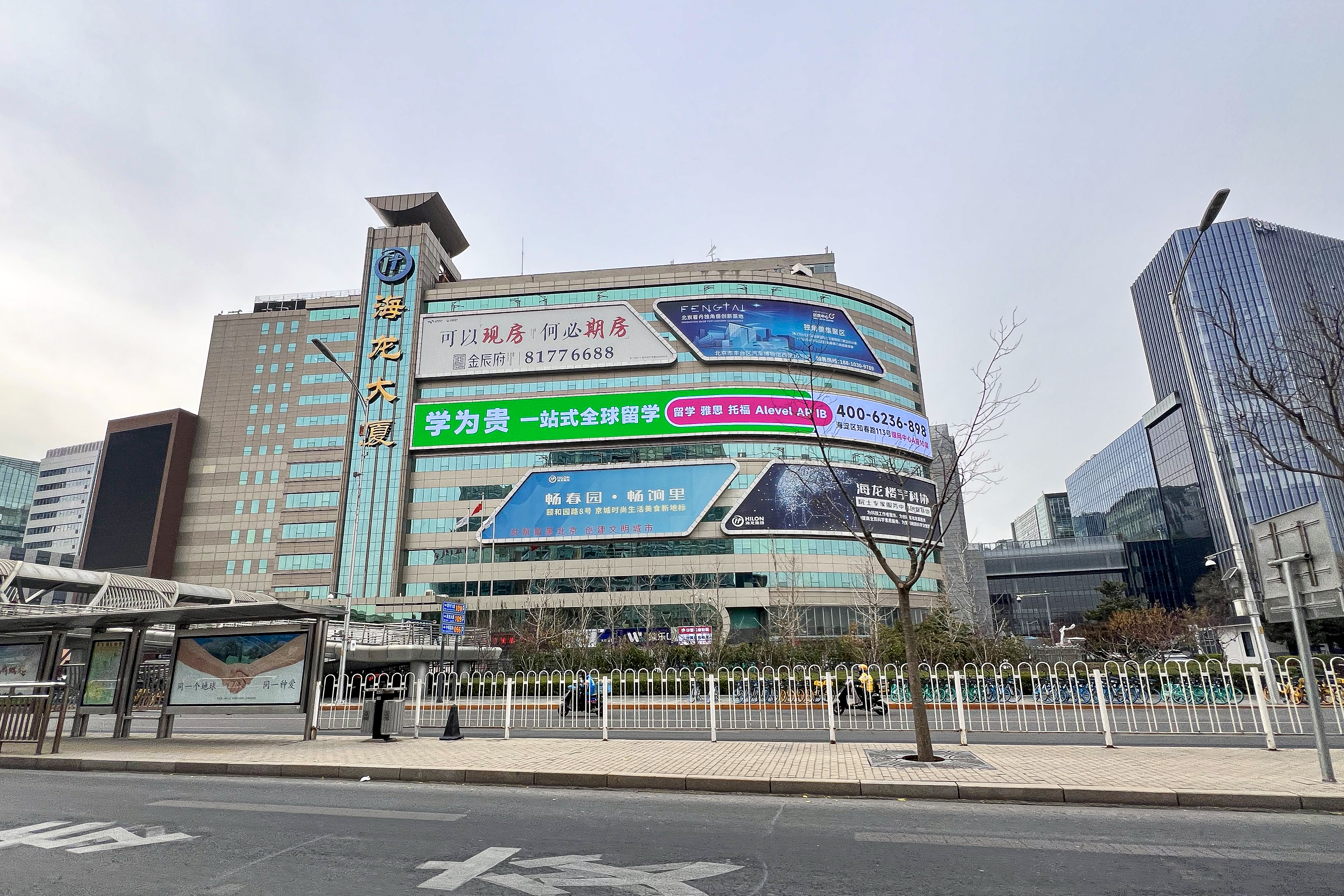
- Exterior
- Interactive map of the Hailong Market area
- Alternative names: Hai Long Market; Hailong Plaza; Hilon Market 海龙大夏

General information
- Location: Zhongguancun, Haidian District, China

Technical details
- Floor count: 7

Website
- www.hilon.com.cn

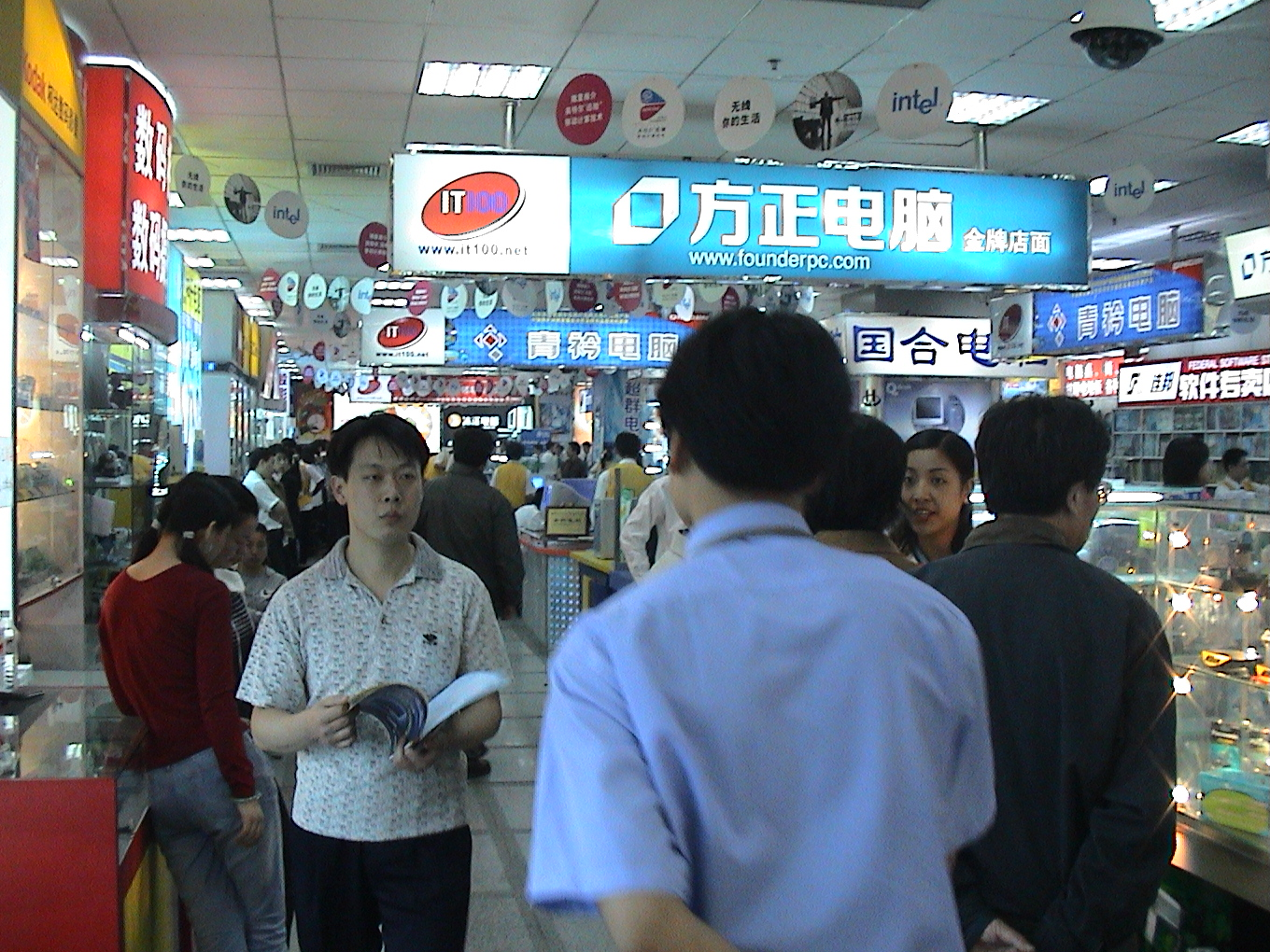
Interior of Hilon Electronics Market, 2003

Hilon Mansion is an office building at 1 Zhongguancun Street, Haidian District, Beijing, which once housed Hilon Electronics Market, one of five major electronics markets in Zhongguancun.

== History ==
Hailong Market opened in December 1999.

== See also ==
- Dinghao Market
- Guigu Market
- Kemao Market
- Taipingyang Market
- Zhonghai Market
