= Zhongguancun =

Technology hub in Haidian District, Beijing, China

Coordinates: 39°58′52″N 116°18′32″E

- Simplified Chinese: 中关村
- Traditional Chinese: 中關村
Transcriptions
Standard Mandarin
- Hanyu Pinyin: Zhōngguāncūn
- IPA: [ʈʂʊ́ŋkwántsʰwə́n]

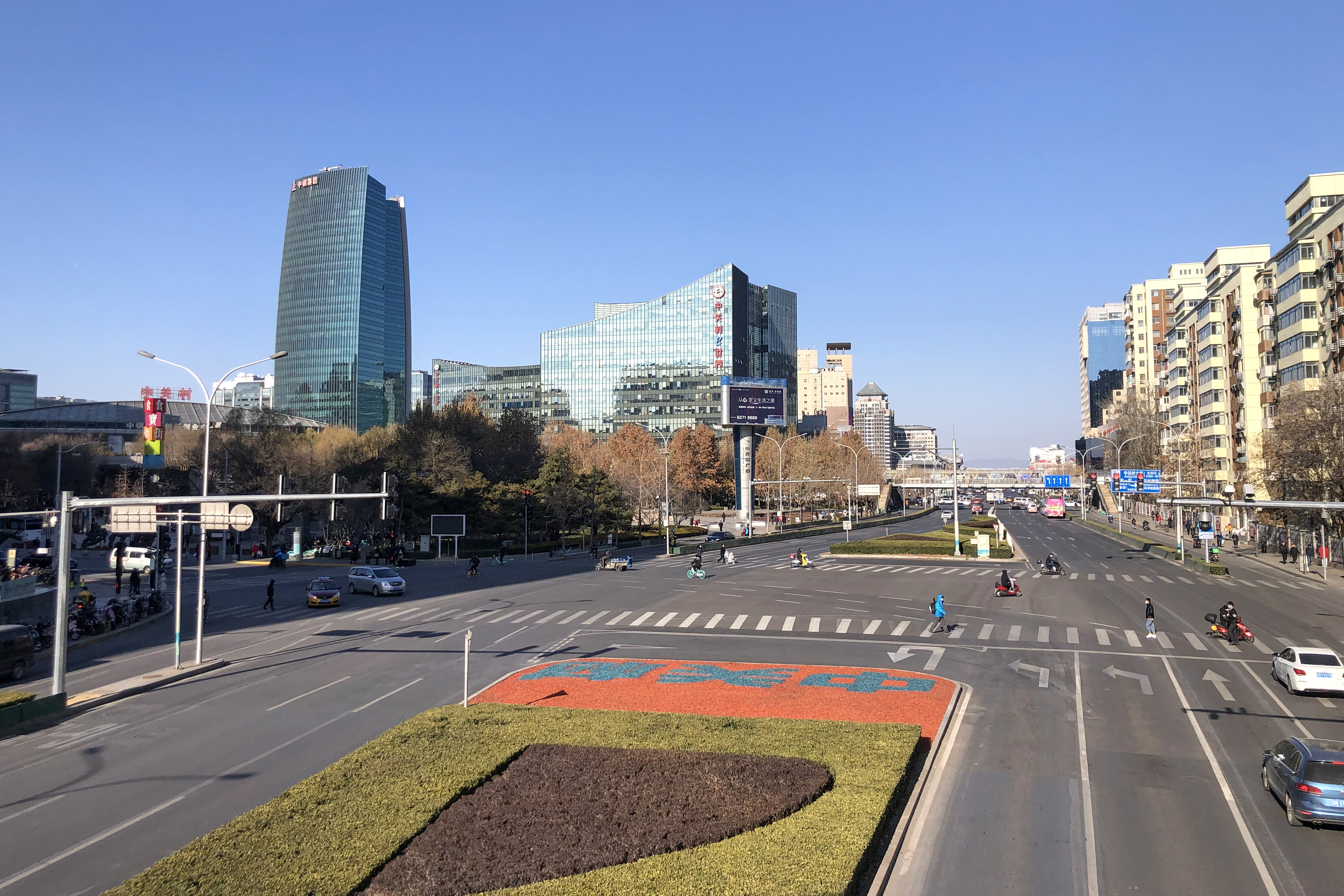
A view of Zhongguancun, including Zhongguancun street and plaza

Zhongguancun (Chinese: 中关村) is a major technology hub in the Haidian District, Beijing, China.

Zhongguancun occupies a band between the northwestern Third Ring Road and the northwestern Fourth Ring Road in the northwestern part of Beijing. Zhongguancun is sometimes known as China's Silicon Valley. The place is also the center of the Beijing-Tianjin-Shijiazhuang Hi-Tech Industrial Belt.

== History ==
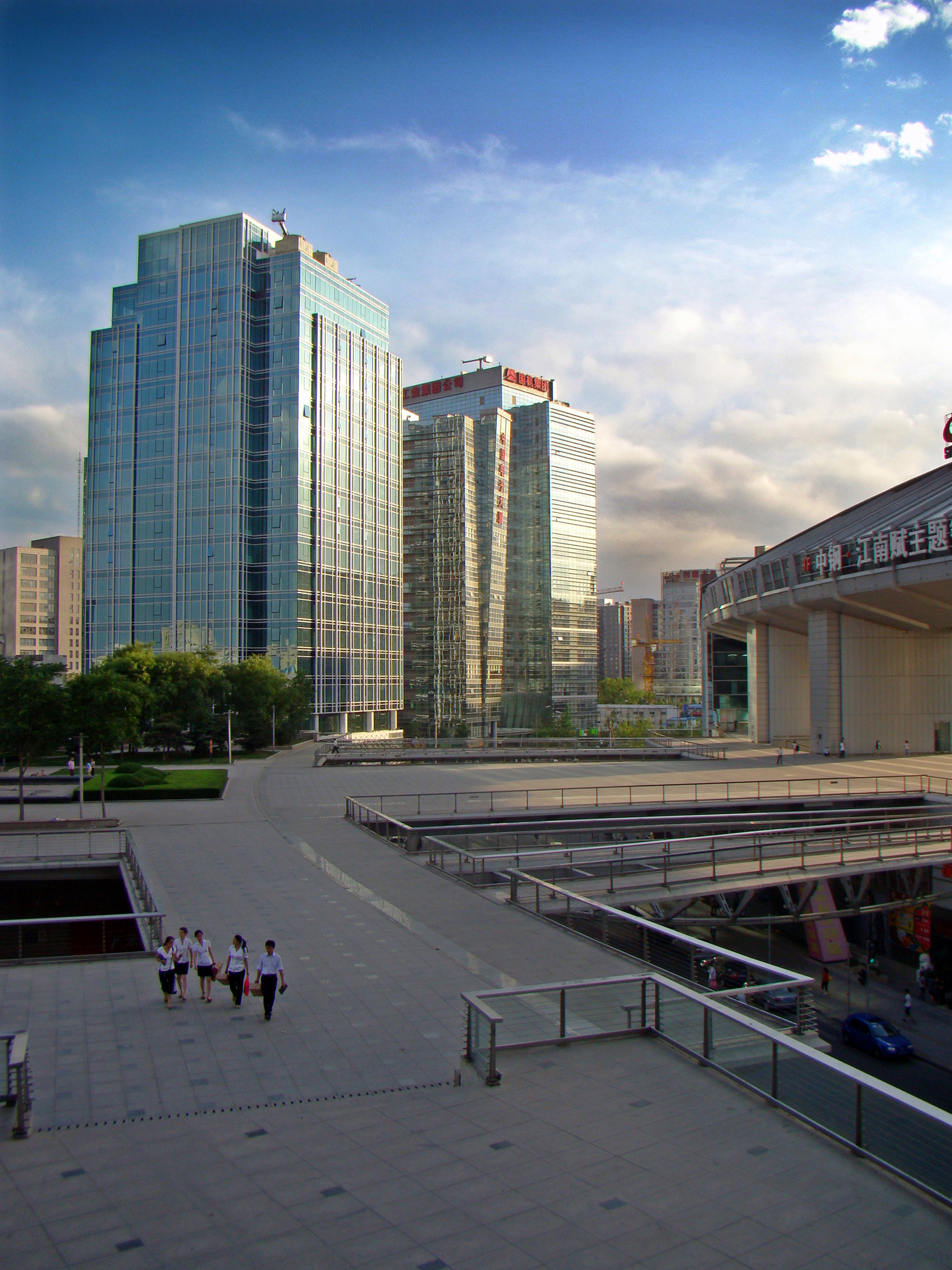
The southwest landscape of Zhongguan plaza

Chen Chunxian envisioned Zhongguancun, which became a well-known technology hub 30 years later. Chunxian, a member of the Chinese Academy of Sciences (CAS), conceived of a Silicon Valley in China following a government-sponsored trip to Boston and Silicon Valley, United States.

Zhongguancun became known as "Electronics Avenue" (simplified Chinese: 电子一条街; traditional Chinese: 電子一條街; pinyin: Diànzǐ Yītiáojiē) in the early 1980s, due to its information technology markets along a central, crowded street.

Zhongguancun was recognized by the central government of China in 1988, and officially named "Beijing High-Technology Industry Development Experimental Zone". In 1999, Zhongguancun became the "Zhongguancun Science & Technology Zone" with seven parks: Haidian, Fengtai, Changping, Electronics City (in Chaoyang), Yizhuang, Desheng, and Jianxiang. The original Zhongguancun became known as the Haidian Park of the Zhongguancun Zone.

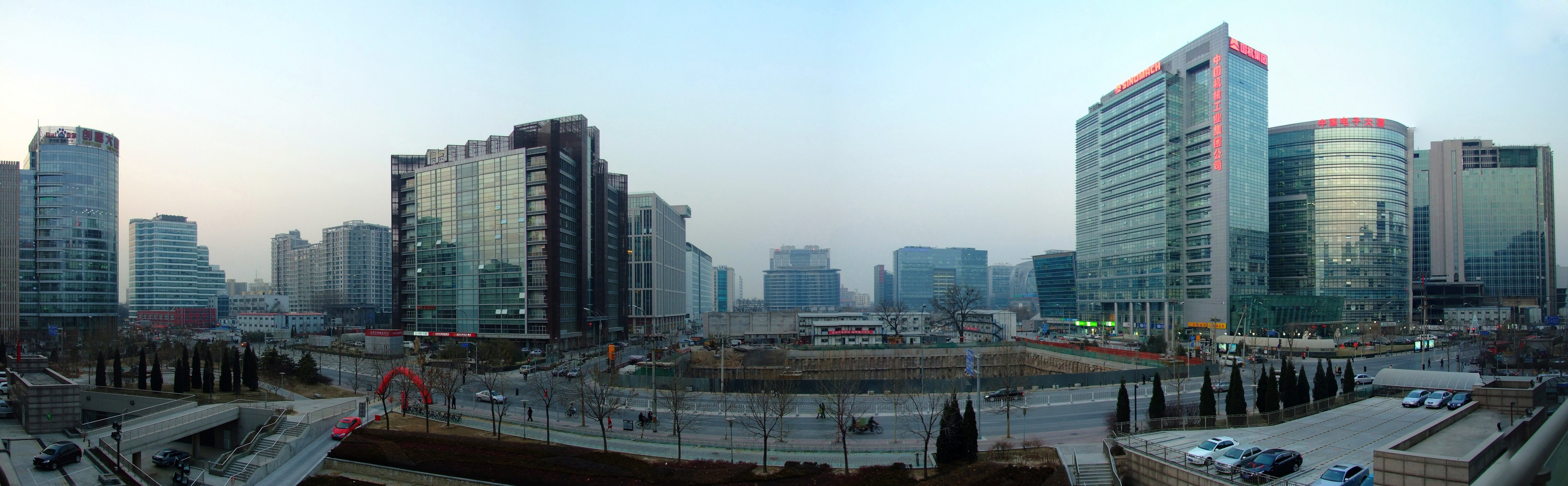
Panorama of tech hub

== Notable education and research centers ==
Zhongguancun has an association with China's two most prestigious universities, Peking University and Tsinghua University, along with Renmin University, Beijing Normal University, and the Chinese Academy of Sciences, all of which are in close proximity.

Also significant education and research institutions are the "two Zhongguancun institutions" (中关村两院, in Chinese) founded in 2024: Zhongguancun Academy and Zhongguancun Institute of Artificial Intelligence.

Secondary schools in Zhongguancun include the Affiliated High School of Peking University and the High School Affiliated to Renmin University of China.

== Administration ==
The Zhongguancun Administrative Committee oversees the city. The State Administration of Foreign Experts Affairs (SAFEA) is headquartered in Zhongguancun.

== Notable companies and landmarks ==
Around the early 2000s,

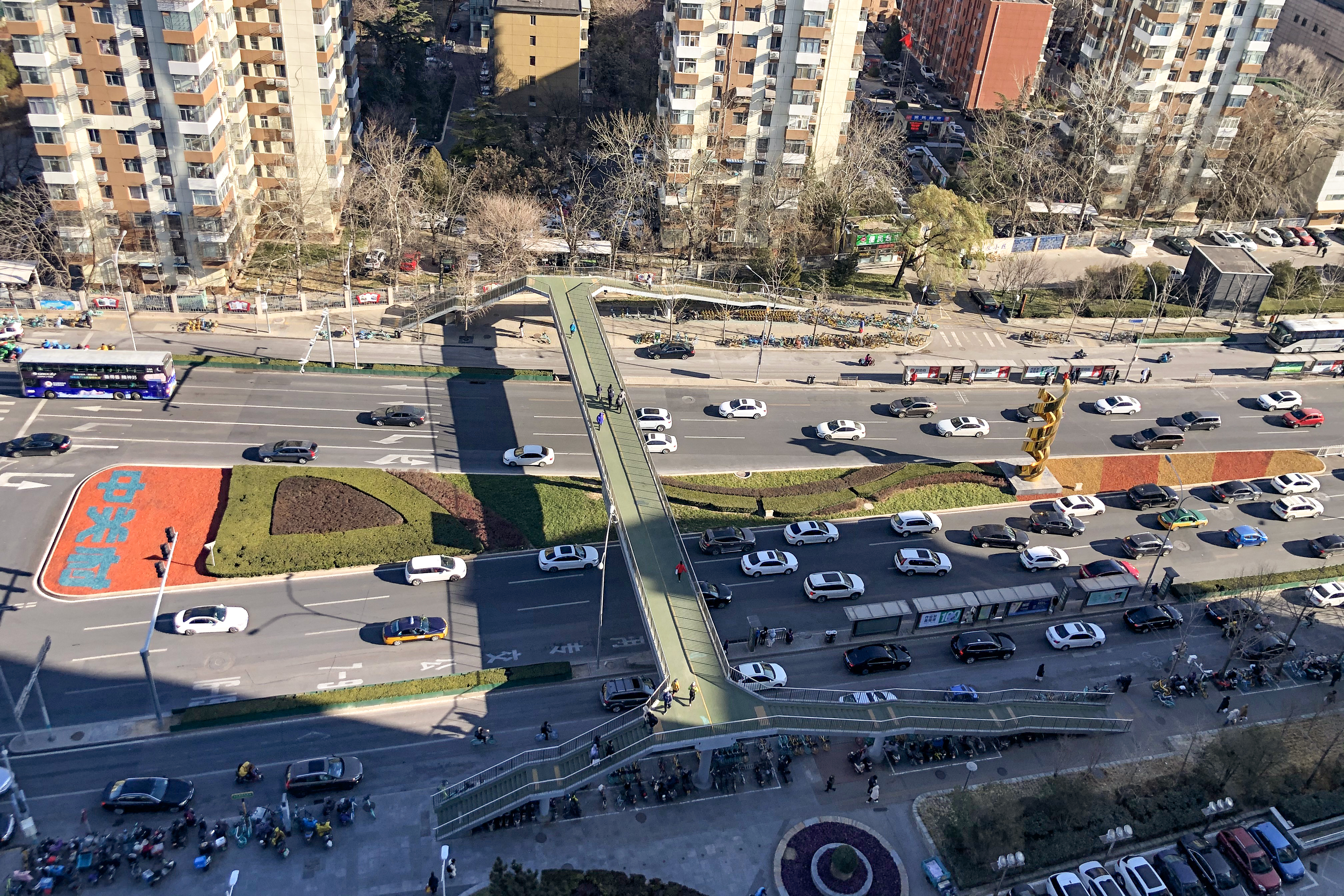
The sculpture Life south of Haidianhuangzhuang North footbridge

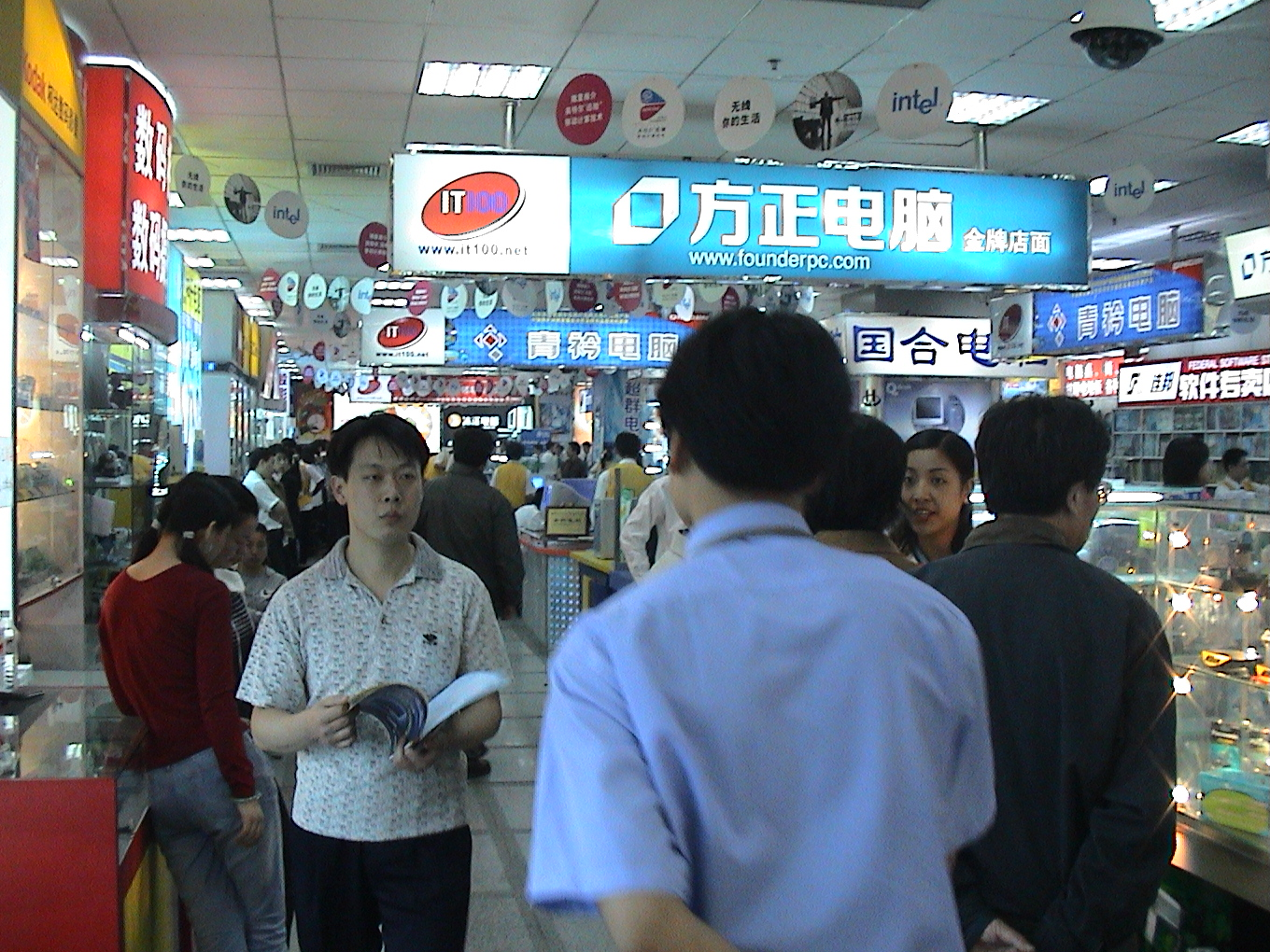
Inside the Hailong market building

Hailong Market, Guigu Market, Taipingyang Market, Dinghao Market and Kemao Market were prominent IT and electronics technology bazaars, noted for "shops with a shop", where bargaining is the norm. But, as of 2025, all have been re-developed into commercial buildings hosting a myriad of mostly new technology-focused companies. According to the 2004 Beijing Statistical Yearbook, there were over 12,000 high-tech enterprises operating in Zhongguancun's seven parks, with 489,000 technicians employed.

Companies that grew up in Zhongguancun are Stone Group, Founder Group, Glodon, and Lenovo Group, each founded from 1984 to 1985. Stone was the first successful technology company to be operated by private individuals outside of the government of China. Founder is a technology company that spun off Peking University. Lenovo Group spun off from Chinese Academy of Sciences with Liu Chuanzhi, a hero of Zhongguancun and current chairman, eventually taking the helm. Lenovo purchased IBM's PC division for $1.75 billion in 2005, making it the world's third-largest PC maker. Both Founder and Lenovo Group maintain strong connections to their academic backers, who are significant shareholders.

Many global technology companies built their Chinese headquarters and research centers in Zhongguancun Technology Park, such as Google, Intel, AMD, Oracle Corporation, Motorola, Cogobuy Group, IBM, MySpace, Sony, Solstice, Glodon Software and Ericsson. Microsoft has built its Chinese research headquarters in the park that costs $280 million and can accommodate 5000 employees, which was completed in April 2011, and now houses Microsoft Research Asia.

The development center of Loongson, which is China's first general-purpose microprocessor design, is also in the Zhongguancun area.

Everbright International has its Beijing office in the Beijing International Building (北京国际大厦) in Zhongguancun.

Many conferences are held in this location, including the annual ChinICT conference - which is the largest Information technology Development and Entrepreneurship event in China.

Frequent tourist destinations are the old campus of Peking University, the Haidian Christian Church designed by Hamburg-based architects Gerkan, Marg and Partners, and nearby Innovation Street complex (previously called "Book Street").

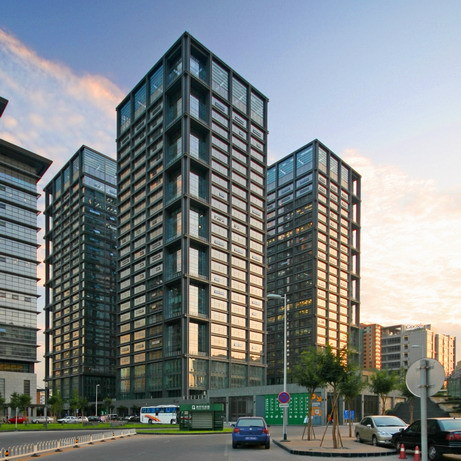
Near to Tuspark

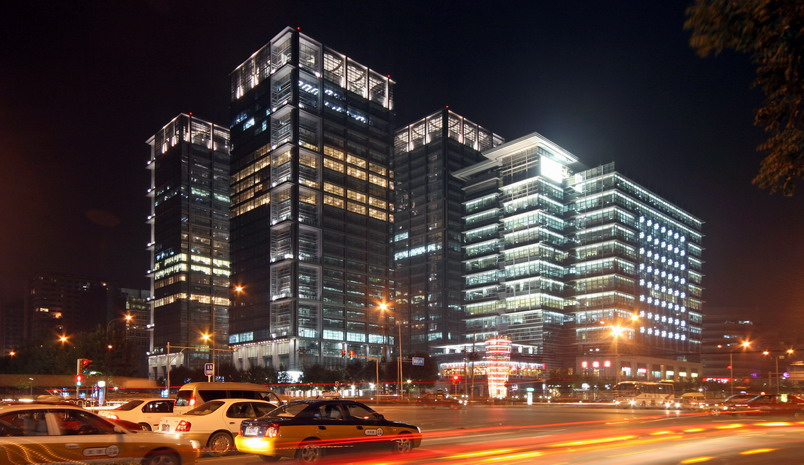
Offices of Microsoft, Sohu

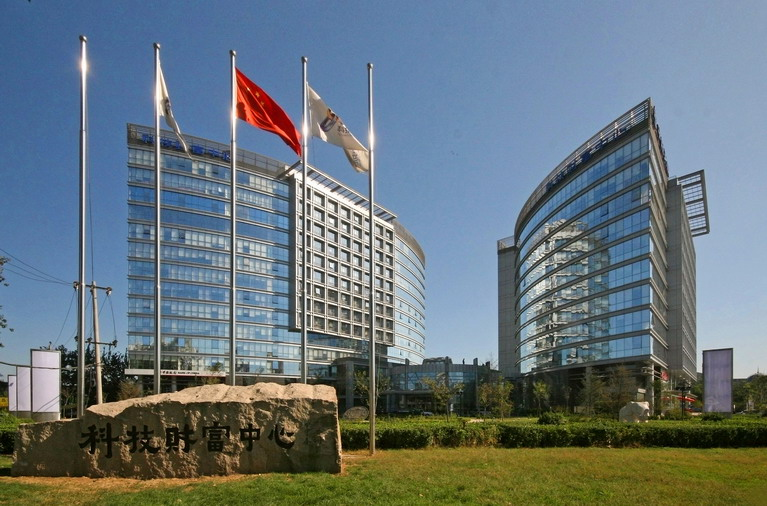

== Transportation ==
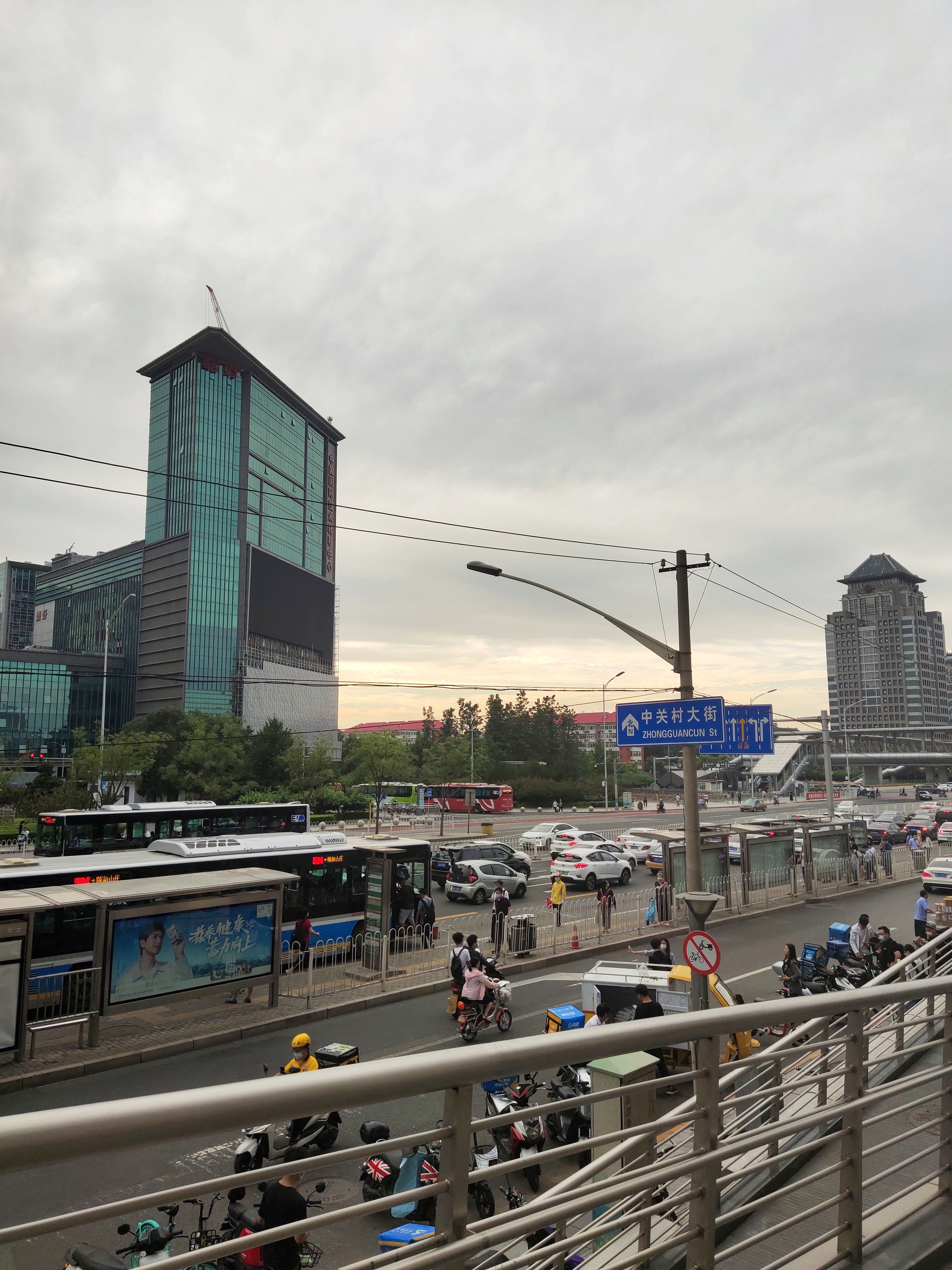
Views near Zhongguancun station

Line 4 of the Beijing Subway runs through the Zhongguancun area with stops at Zhongguancun station and Haidian Huangzhuang station. Haidian Huangzhuang station is also a transfer station with Line 10. In addition, Zhongguancun is served by many of Beijing's buses.

== See also ==
- List of technology centers around the world
- China Beijing Equity Exchange
- Zhongguancun Administrative Committee
- Zhongguancun Subdistrict
