= Meinhard von Gerkan =

German architect (1935–2022)

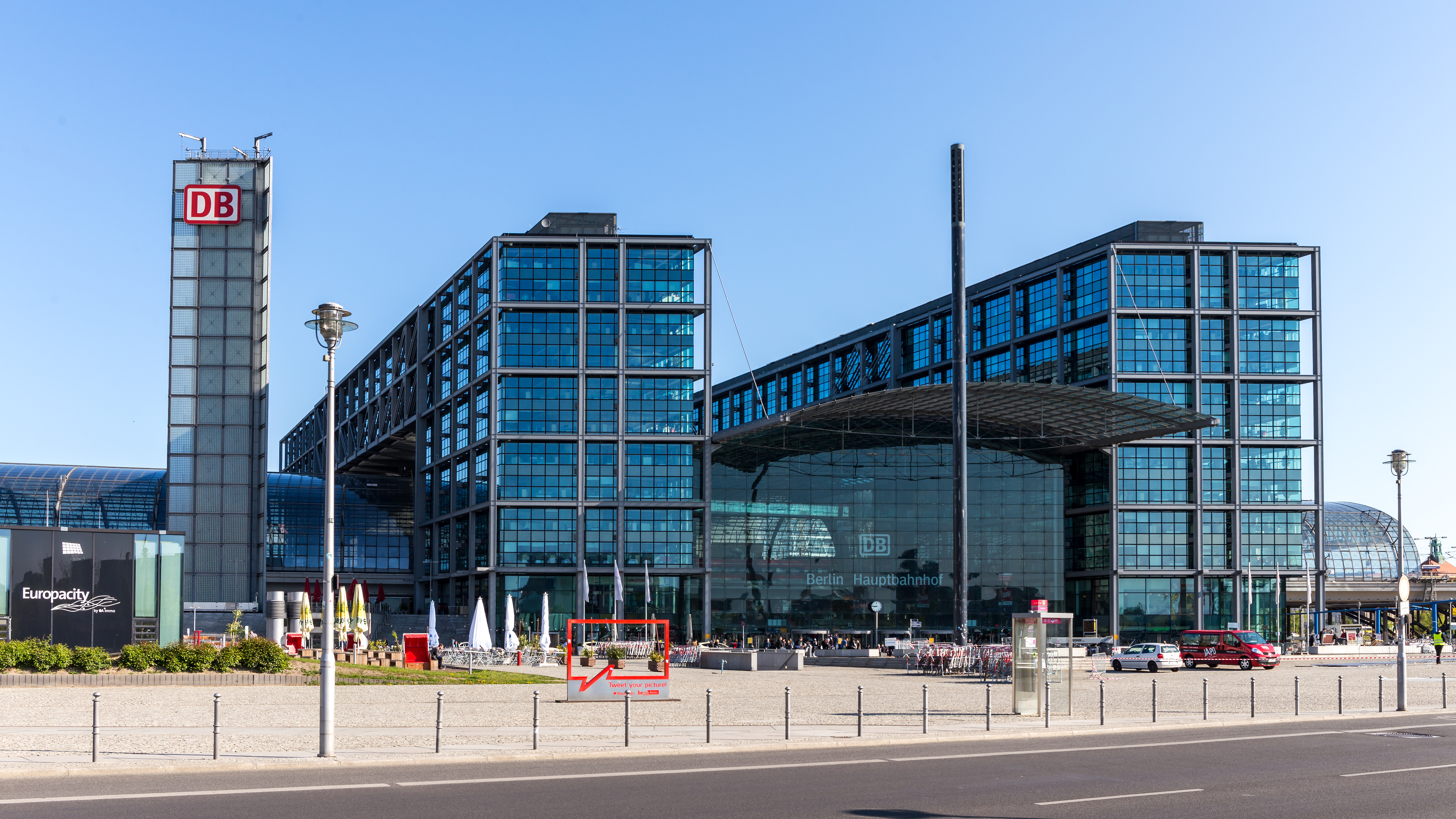
- Berlin Hauptbahnhof, one of von Gerkan's projects
- Born: 3 January 1935; Riga, Latvia
- Died: 30 November 2022 (aged 87); Hamburg, Germany
- Education: Technical University of Braunschweig
- Occupation: Architect

Meinhard von Gerkan (3 January 1935 – 30 November 2022) was a German architect and one of the founders of the architectural firm von Gerkan, Marg and Partners (gmp). Von Gerkan was known for being the architect of Berlin Tegel Airport and Berlin Hauptbahnhof ('Berlin main railway station'). At the time of his death, Deutsche Welle described him as "Germany's most famous architect".

== Early life and education ==
Meinhard von Gerkan was born on 3 January 1935 in Riga, Latvia, to a Baltic German family. He was baptized at St. Peter's Church. Von Gerkan was an only child, and considered his childhood in Riga "idyllic". His family lived on what is now called Eduarda Smiļģa Street, and spent summers in the resort town of Jūrmala, where they stayed at a wooden house.

In 1939, at the age of four, he moved with his family to Poznań when they were forced to emigrate from Latvia. His father was a soldier during World War II, and died on the Eastern Front in 1942. Von Gerkan and his mother left Poznań to settle in Lower Saxony in 1945. His mother died shortly afterward, and as an orphan, von Gerkan stayed with a number of foster families before settling with a pastor's family in Hamburg in 1949.

Von Gerkan attended various schools while growing up, including a Waldorf school in Hamburg from which he failed to graduate. He eventually graduated with an Abitur from a night school in 1955. Von Gerkan began his university studies in Hamburg, focusing on law and physics, before transferring to Technische Universität Berlin in 1956 to study architecture. He met his future business partner Volkwin Marg in Berlin. Von Gerkan switched universities again in 1960, transferring to the Technical University of Braunschweig, which he graduated from in 1964.

== Berlin Hauptbahnhof ==
External image
- Von Gerkan's original design of the lower platforms at Berlin Hauptbahnhof

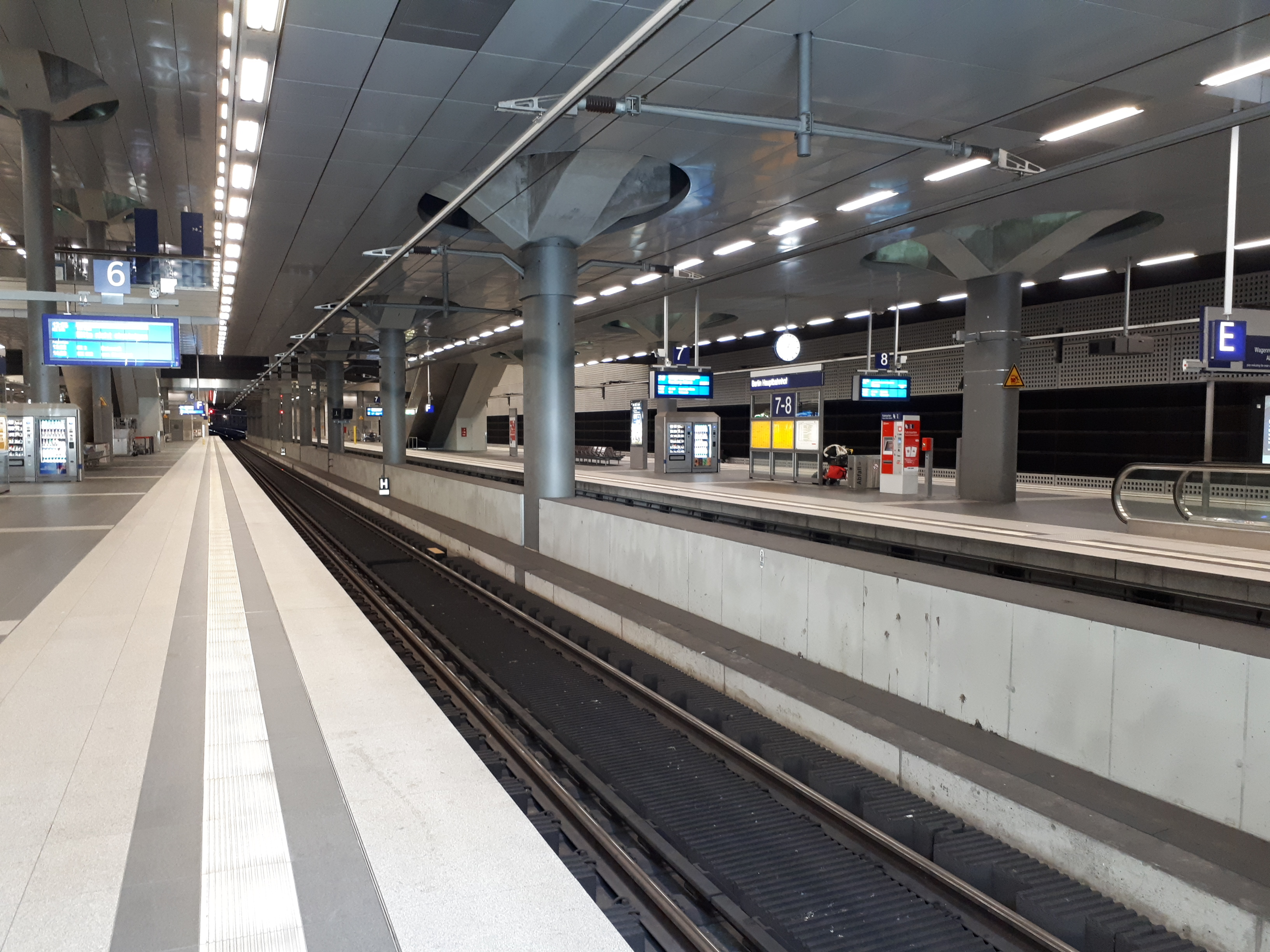
The lower platforms, in 2020

Von Gerkan won the competition to design Berlin Hauptbahnhof in the early 1990s. After von Gerkan completed his design, Deutsche Bahn hired another firm to replace the vaulted ceiling in the design with a flat one, without informing the original architect. Von Gerkan sued Deutsche Bahn, comparing the action to "ripping pages out of a novel", and the judge ruled in favor of von Gerkan, stating that the building had been "considerably defaced" by Deutsche Bahn.

The court ruling ordered Deutsche Bahn to replace the station's flat ceilings with the vaulted ones in von Gerkan's original design. Deutsche Bahn stated that it would take about three years to do so, and cost roughly 40 million EUR, while von Gerkan's firm stated that it would cost at most half as much, and that the station could continue to operate during that time. The matter was eventually settled in a confidential agreement, which included a sizeable donation to Academy for Architectural Culture, an organization founded by gmp, von Gerkan's firm. Süddeutsche Zeitung reported that an anonymous source who attended the negotiations stated that gmp received a high seven-figure amount.

== Awards ==
- Großer BDA Preis (2005)
- Cross of Recognition, Second Class (2021) (Note: Latvia's Cross of Recognition is awarded in five classes, with recipients of the second class being referred to as grand officers of the award.)

== Personal life ==
From his first marriage, von Gerkan had two daughters, including costume design professor Florence. He was married to his second wife, Sabine Rechenbach, from 1985 until his death. They had three children. Von Gerkan also had another daughter, model and jewelry designer Manon. In addition, he was related to architect and archaeologist Armin von Gerkan, who served as director of the German Archaeological Institute's department in Rome from 1938 to 1944.

Von Gerkan spoke with a Baltic German accent even late in life.
