= Gerkan, Marg and Partners =

Architectural firm based in Hamburg

gmp von Gerkan, Marg und Partner

Practice information
- Partners: Meinhard von Gerkan, Volkwin Marg
- Founded: 1965
- Location: Elbchaussee 139, 22763 Hamburg, Germany
- Coordinates: 53°32′44″N 9°54′50″E

Website
- www.gmp-architekten.de

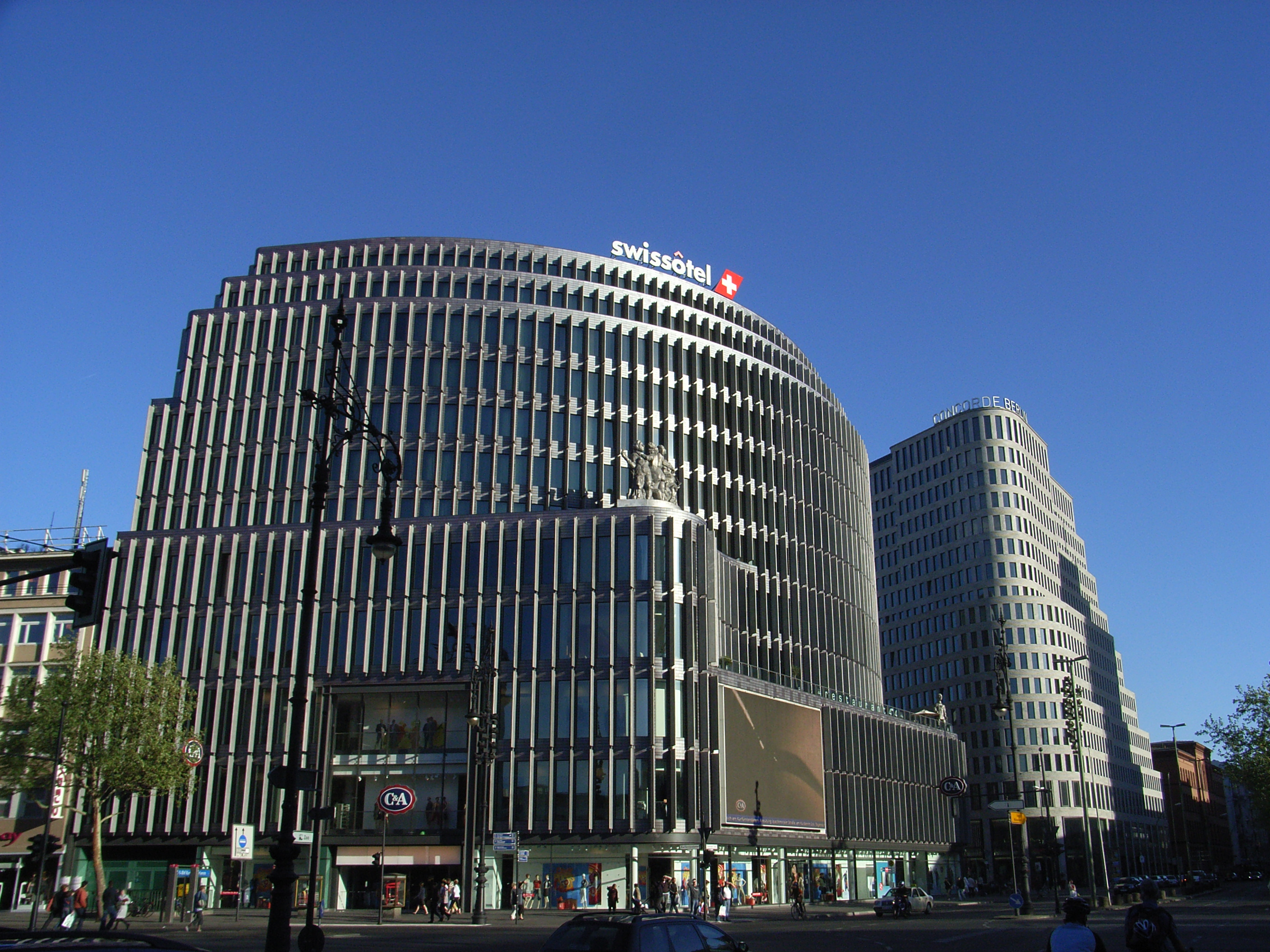
Swissôtel Berlin, opened 2001

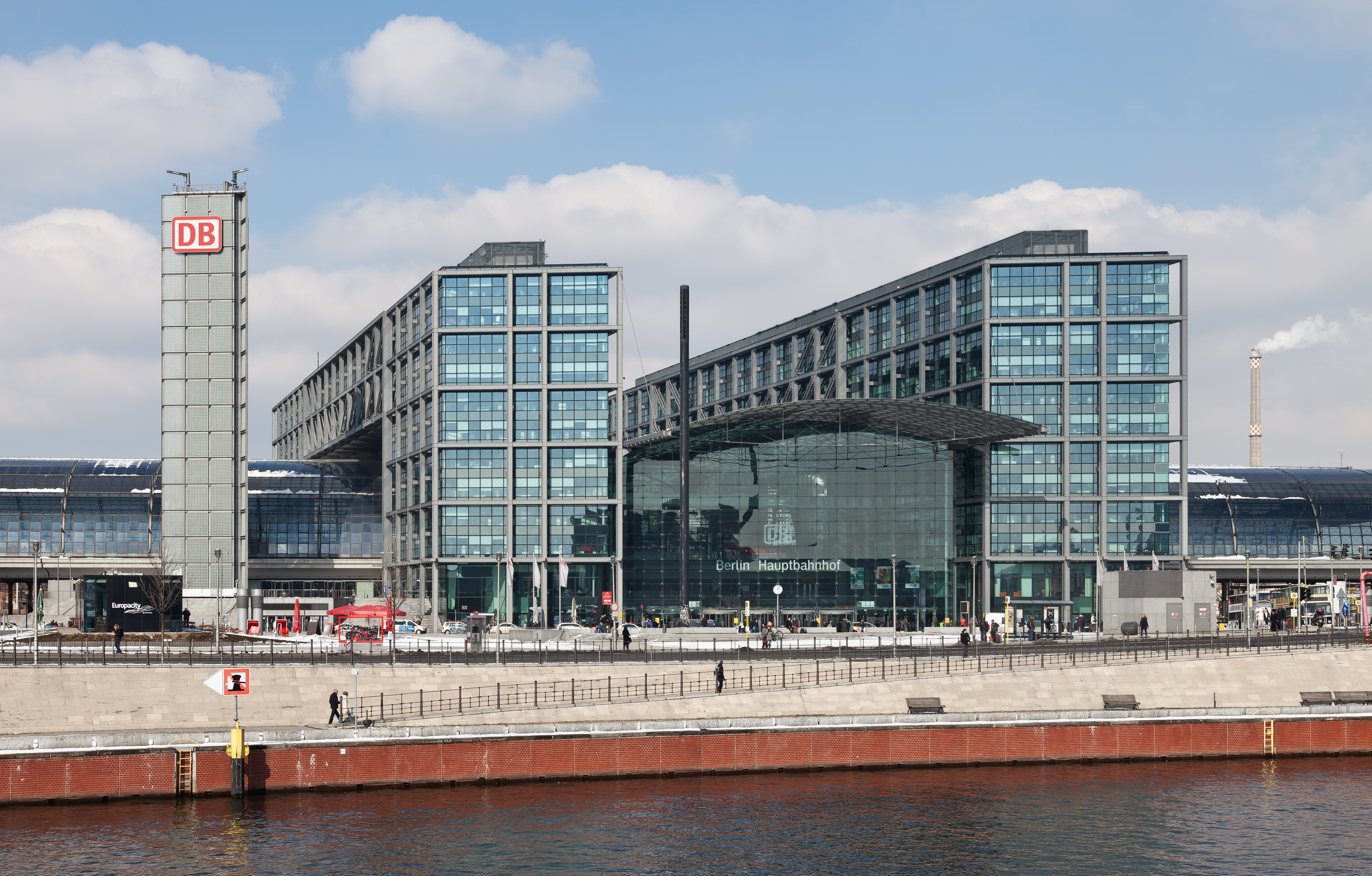
Berlin Hauptbahnhof, opened 2006

Gerkan, Marg & Partners (gmp) is an international architectural company based in Hamburg, Germany. The company was founded in 1965 by Meinhard von Gerkan and Volkwin Marg, and now has more than 300 employees in 13 offices. In the same year the architectural practice took part in an international competition with an anonymus entry. Their design for the Berlin Tegel Airport was able to win the first prize, thus garnering the company international recognition. This achievement cemented the practice's standing in the world of architecture and paved the way for further success. The company is currently being headed by the two founders alongside their executive partners (Nikolaus Goetze, Hubert Nienhoff, Stephan Schütz and Wu Wei).

Furthermore, gmp has branches throughout the world, including locations in China (Beijing, Shenzhen, Shanghai) and Vietnam (Hanoi), but also divisions in other German cities (Aachen, Berlin). According to company statements, it has amassed an impressive record of over 600 prizes in the field of architecture and subsequently related disciplines. 400 of which the practice was able to take home the first prize. The company has also taken part in the construction of close to 500 buildings in 23 countries. In 2008 gmp founded the Academy for Architectural Culture, a private institution aimed at answering the quintessensial questions of architectural design, as well as aiding the development of young architects from different cultural backgrounds.

== Notable projects ==
- Berlin Tegel Airport Terminals A&B, Berlin, Germany (1974)
- Leipzig Trade Fair, Leipzig, Germany (1996)
- Hörn Bridge, Kiel, Germany (1997)
- Swissôtel Berlin, Berlin, Germany (2001)
- Berlin Hauptbahnhof, Berlin, Germany (2006)
- Vietnam National Convention Center, Hanoi, Vietnam (2006)
- Haidian Christian Church, Beijing, China (2007)
- Moses Mabhida Stadium, Durban, South Africa (2009)
- Hanoi Museum, Hanoi, Vietnam (2010)
- Jawaharlal Nehru Stadium, Delhi, India, redesign (2006), renovated by 2010
- SPM Swimming Pool Complex, Delhi, India, redesign (2006), renovated by 2010
- Tamil Nadu Government Multi Super Speciality Hospital, Chennai, India (2010)
- Shanghai Oriental Sports Center, Shanghai, China (2010)
- National Museum of China reconstruction, Beijing, China (2011)
- New headquarters of Ministry of Public Security, Hanoi, Vietnam (2011)
- Arena Națională, Bucharest, Romania (2011)
- Olimpiysky National Sports Complex reconstruction, Kyiv, Ukraine (2011)
- Tianjin Grand Theatre, opened 2012
- National Stadium, Warsaw, Poland (2012)
- Berlin Brandenburg Airport, Germany, dismissed from the project (2012), resume (2018)
- Lingang New City, Shanghai, China
- Crystal Hall, Baku, Azerbaijan
- Milliy Stadium, Tashkent, Uzbekistan (2012)
- Estádio Nacional de Brasília, Brazil (2013)
- Estádio Mineirão, Belo Horizonte, Brazil (2013)
- Arena da Amazônia, Manaus, Brazil (2013)
- Estadio Santiago Bernabéu, Madrid, Spain, renovation design (2014), remodeling (2017), construction started in 2019
- National Assembly Building of Vietnam, Hanoi, Vietnam (2014)
- Dongguan Basketball Center, Dongguan, China (2014)
- Krasnodar Stadium, Krasnodar, Russia (2016)
- Deutsches Haus Ho Chi Minh City, Vietnam (2017)
- National Stadium of Luxembourg, Luxembourg City, Luxembourg (2020)
- Jeddah Central Stadium, Jeddah, Saudi Arabia (2024)
- Rafi Cricket Stadium, Karachi, Pakistan (2017)

== Awards ==
The company has received several awards, for instance, the MIPIM AR Future Project Award 2005 for Lingang New City, China (Masterplanned Communities Category). The city was part of Shanghai's One City, Nine Towns initiative. In its master plan, GMP Architekten used a design of circular roads around a large lake, inspired by Garden city principles.

== See also ==
- Buildings by Gerkan, Marg and Partners
