= TusPark (Shanghai) =

Industrial park in Shanghai, China

The Tuspark Shanghai (Chinese: 清华科技园（上海）) or Shanghai Multimedia Valley (SMV), Tsinghua University Science Park is a Chinese high-tech company which builds business parks. It is located in Zhabei District of Shanghai, among Gonghe New Road, Pengyuepu River, Guangzhong West Road and Lingshi Road. The SMV was established in August 2002.

== See also ==
- Silicon Valley
- Light Valley
- Pharmaceutics Valley
- Nanometer Valley
