= Monuments and memorials in Riga =

There are many monuments and memorials in the Latvian capital Riga.

== List of monuments and memorials ==
| Description | Date | Sculptor | Picture | Notes |
|---|---|---|---|---|
| Monument to Filippo Paulucci | 1851 | | | |
| Monument to Rainis | 1965 | Kārlis Zemdega | | |
| Monument to Johann Gottfried Herder | | | | |
| Monument to Michael Andreas Barclay de Tolly | | | | Copy of the now lost 1913 sculpture; a new monument was created by the initiative and by donations of local businessman J. Grombergs in 2001 |
| Kalpaks monument | | | | |
| Statue of George and Cecile Armitstead | 2006 | Andris Vārpa | | |
| Pushkin Statue | 2009 | Alexander Tartynov | | |
| Monument to Kārlis Padegs | | | | |
| Monument to Mstislav Keldysh | | | | |
| Gravestone of Baltic-German Mailinger family | | | | In the Great Cemetery |
| Gravestone of A. and R. Hartvigs | | | | In Matisa Cemetery |
| Andrejs Pumpurs gravestone | 1929 | Kārlis Zāle | | In Lielie Cemetery |
| Monument to Jānis Čakste | | | | In Meža Cemetery |
| Monument to Lielais Kristaps | | | | |
| Freedom Monument | 1935 | Kārlis Zāle; Ernests Štālbergs | | |
| Monument to the soldiers of 1919 | 1937 | Kārlis Zāle | | In Sudrabkalniņš memorial gardens |
| Vērmanes Garden Memorial | 1829 | | | |
| Russian Revolution (1905) monument | | | | In the Grīziņkalns area |
| Latvian Rifleman monument | 1971 | Valdis Albergs | | In front of the Museum of the Occupation of Latvia |
| Monument to the Liberators of Soviet Latvia and Riga from the German Fascist Invaders | 1985 | Lev Bukovsky; Aivars Gulbis | | Removed on 25 August 2022 |
| Monument to Bremen Town Musicians | | | | |
| Torņakalns Memorial to Victims of Communist Terror | 1990 | Ojārs Feldbergs | | In Torņakalns Station |
