= Remembrance Day of the Latvian Legionnaires =

Day commemorating Latvian soldiers of the 15th and 19th Waffen SS units

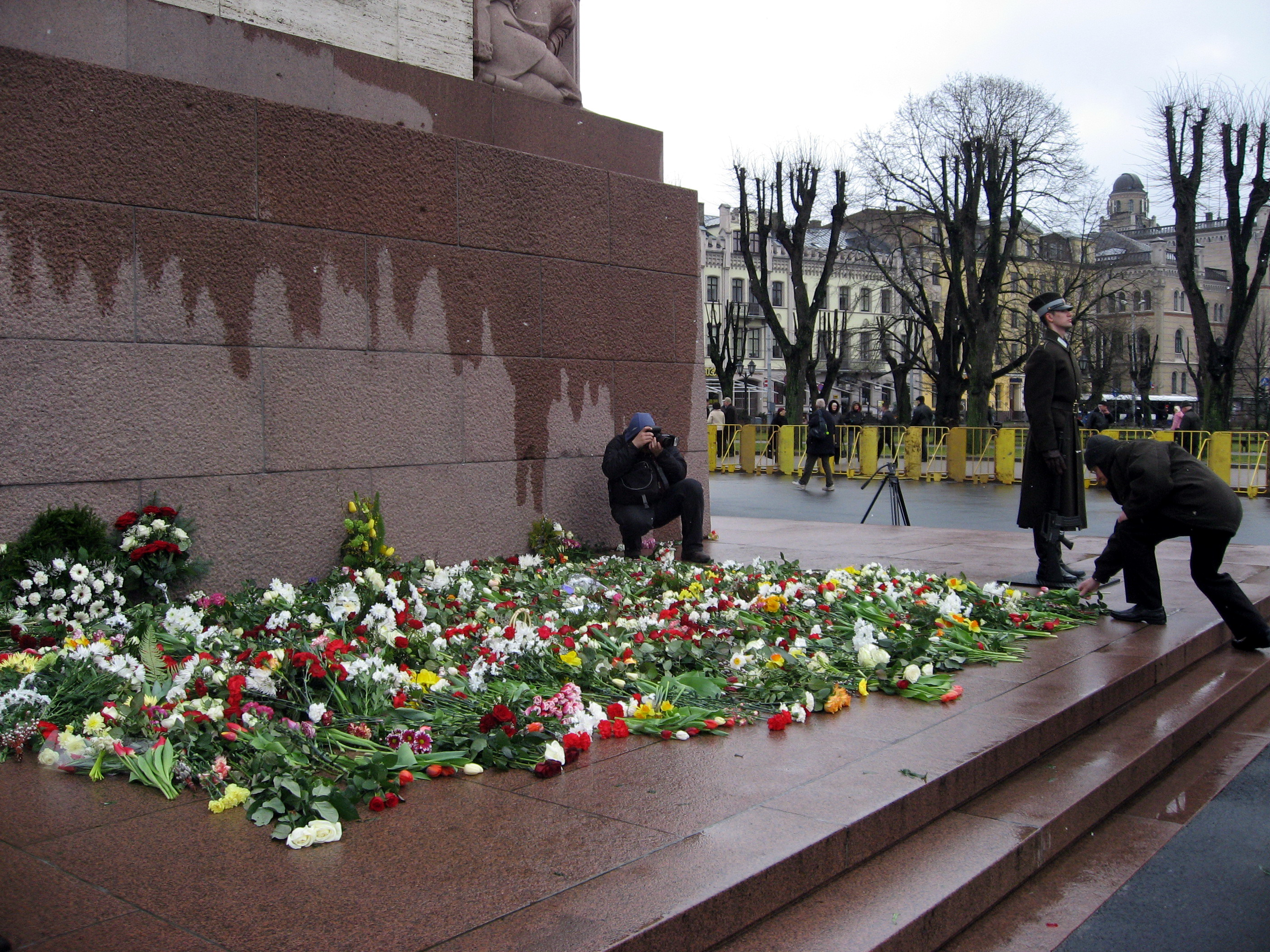
- Flowers being laid at the foot of the Freedom Monument
- Observed by: Former members of the Latvian Legion, their relatives and supporters
- Significance: The 15th (1st Latvian) and the 19th Waffen Grenadier Division of the SS (2nd Latvian) fighting alongside for the first and only time against the Red Army in 1944
- Celebrations: Memorial service in Riga Cathedral, procession to the Freedom Monument, laying flowers at the Freedom Monument and a cemetery in Lestene
- Date: 16 March
- Frequency: Annual

Remembrance Day of the Latvian Legionnaires (Latvian: Leģionāru piemiņas diena), often known simply as the Legionnaire Day (Leģionāru diena) or 16 March (16. marts) in Latvia, is a day when soldiers of the Latvian Legion, part of the Waffen-SS, are commemorated. From 1998 until 2000, it was officially recognized as a "Remembrance Day for Latvian soldiers" by the Saeima.

The day has been controversial as the Legion was a unit of Nazi Germany, and the remembrance day has been criticized by the European Commission against Racism and Intolerance, Russia, Canada, and Jewish organizations such as Simon Wiesenthal Center. Others argue that no one has ever been convicted of committing war crimes as a member of the Legion and hold that it was a purely military unit fighting against the Soviet Union that had occupied Latvia in 1940.

== Origins ==
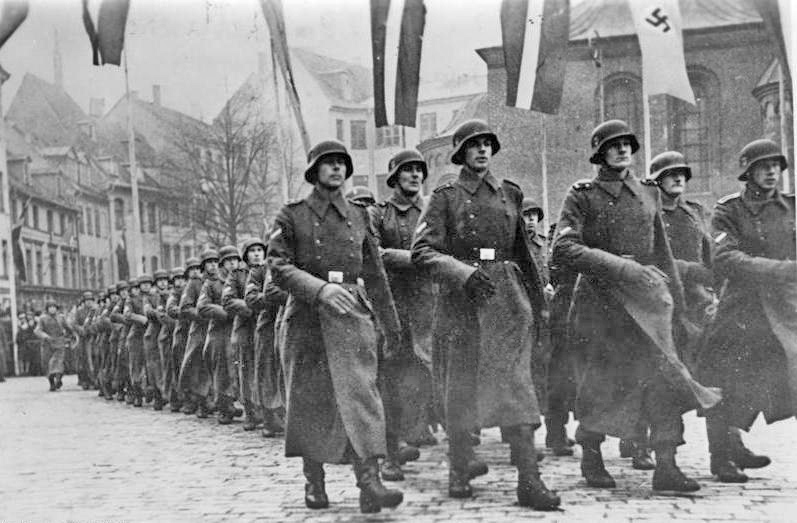
Latvian Legion in 1943

The idea of a Remembrance Day for the Latvian legionnaires was raised in exile by the Hawks of Daugava veterans' organization in 1952. The date of 16 March was chosen because in 1944 both divisions of the Latvian Legion, the 15th (1st Latvian) and the 19th (2nd Latvian) fought alongside each other, for the first and only time, against the Red Army.

From 16 to 18 March 1944, heavy battles were fought on the eastern bank of the Velikaya River for "Hill 93.4", a strategically important height, defended by the 15th and the 19th Waffen-SS divisions. On 16 March at 6:40, the Soviet assault began with a massive artillery barrage. At 7:00, the Soviet tanks and infantry launched an attack on "Hill 93.4" and captured it at 11:00 as the defenders withdrew. On 18 March at 17:40, the reinforced and approximately 300-men-strong 15th Division, led by Colonel Artūrs Silgailis, recaptured the hill in a counterattack with relatively small losses – seven non-commissioned officers and soldiers killed, 20 wounded and five missing. After that, the Red Army did not try to attack there again.

== History ==
=== 1989/90–2000 ===
Remembrance Day of the Latvian legionnaires has been publicly observed in Latvia since 1989/90. It was officially recognized as a "Remembrance Day for Latvian soldiers" by the Saeima in 1998, a compromise between the For Fatherland and Freedom/LNNK party who wanted to establish the day as the "Remembrance Day for the Latvian Legion" and other members of the coalition fearing the potential effect such a move would have on the international reputation of Latvia. In 1998, the procession to lay flowers at the base of the Freedom Monument drew the attention of foreign media. In 2000, the Latvian government abolished it as an official commemoration day. Observance continued unofficially.

=== 2005–2008 ===
In 2005, a counterdemonstration was dispersed by police, arresting some of its participants; and the procession itself was condemned by the Simon Wiesenthal Center. In 2006, the Latvian government tried to bring the situation under control by fencing off the Freedom Monument, with Riga City Council claiming it required restoration. Some later questioned this statement, as politicians named various other reasons for the move, the enclosed area was much larger than needed for restoration, and the weather did not seem appropriate for restoration. The unapproved events took place despite the ban and 65 participants were arrested by Latvian police, two of the arrested participants being citizens of Estonia. In 2006, laws requiring approval to arrange gatherings were ruled out as unconstitutional.

On 16 March 2007, the government mobilized the police force to guard the vicinity of the monument and the day went by relatively peacefully. The veterans' organizations Daugavas Vanagi and National Association of Latvian Soldiers have announced that they dissociate themselves from ultra-radicals who organize processions at the monument and advised patriotic Latvians to attend other events. In 2008, the confrontation was limited to verbal arguments and insults.

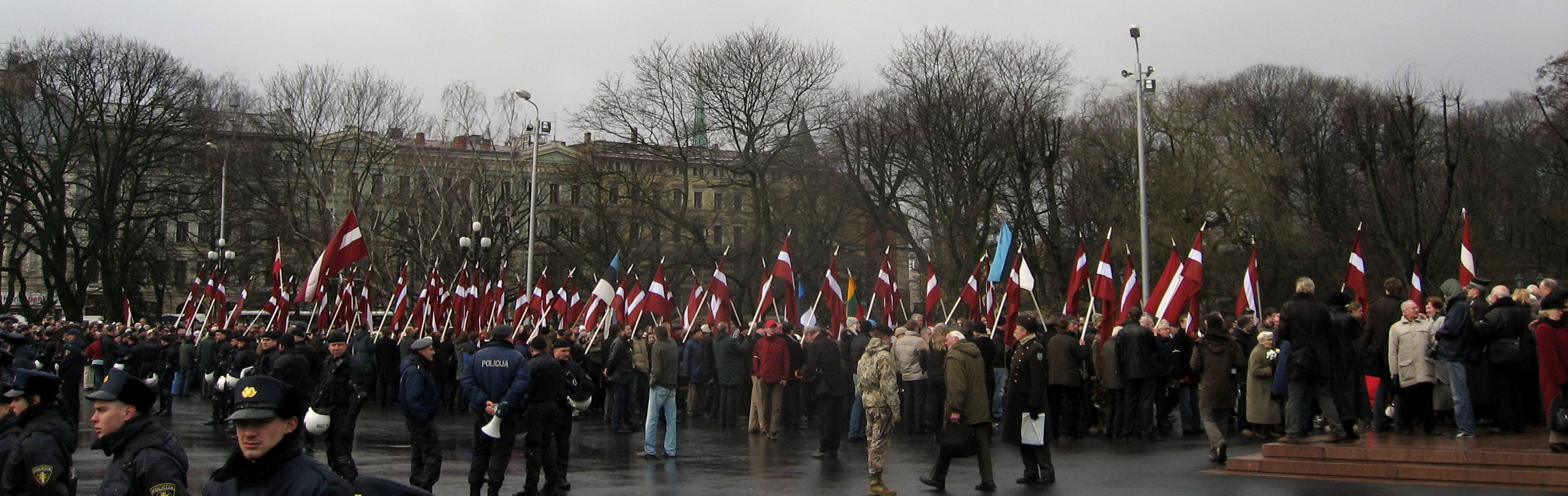
2008 Legionnaire Day procession through the flag alley at the foot of Freedom Monument

=== 2009–2011 ===
Following the 2009 Riga riot, Riga City Council banned the 2009 procession and two counterdemonstrations, citing fears of unrest. Around 300 people disobeyed the ban, walking to lay flowers at the Freedom Monument under heavy police protection. A few counterdemonstrators were arrested. The head of the Anti-Fascist Committee of Latvia had invited its supporters to go on "an excursion" around Old Riga that day.

In 2010, Riga City Council banned the procession and a counterdemonstration. On 15 March, the Riga District Court overruled the ban, and 500 to 1,000 people participated in the 2010 commemoration events in Riga the next day. In 2011, to avert provocation and public disturbances all six, both pro- and anti-Legionnaire Day events were once again disallowed. Nonetheless, around 1,000 people went on the procession and approximately 100 protested against it.

=== 2012–present ===
In 2012, around 2,000 people took part in the procession and 1,200 police officers were employed to maintain order in Riga. Prime Minister Valdis Dombrovskis called for coalition ministers from the National Alliance not to participate in the events, warning that otherwise they might lose their ministerial positions. Three people were detained; one for displaying fascist symbols, one for displaying Soviet symbols and one for disturbing the work of police officers.

On 11 March 2014, the government of Latvia agreed to forbid ministers from attending 16 March events. Nevertheless, the Minister of Environmental Protection and Regional Development Einārs Cilinskis from National Alliance stated that he intended to take part in the procession as he had done for the past 16 years; which resulted in Cilinskis losing his ministerial post. Protesters from the "Association Against Nazism" were moved to a fenced-in zone in adjacent Bastejkalns Park where they installed improvised gallows. The day passed without serious incident, though seven people were arrested for various misdemeanours.

In 2013, the Saeima rejected a proposal from the National Alliance to amend the law on Holidays and Remembrance Days and make Legionnaire Day a national remembrance day. In 2018 and 2019, the Saeima turned down similar proposals from the National Alliance.

In 2016, British YouTuber and freelance journalist Graham Phillips was detained for disrupting the day's events and resisting police orders in what was described as a "provocation" by the Latvian Interior Minister Rihards Kozlovskis, after which Phillips was deported from Latvia and after an additional assessment, denied entry into the country for the next three years. Six members of the Berlin-based Association of Persecutees of the Nazi Regime – Federation of Antifascists (Antifa) were also said to have been denied entry into the country. 13 members of Saeima were reported to have participated in the Remembrance Day of the Latvian Legionnaires procession, while 40 people protested.

In 2017, five people were detained during the procession in Riga, two for resisting the police and three for violating regulations on meetings, processions, and pickets.

In 2021, no public remembrance events took place on 16 March because of the COVID-19 pandemic in Latvia. In 2023, "several hundred" people, including members of the National Alliance, participated in the parade in Riga.

== Controversy ==
As part of the Waffen-SS, the Latvian Legion is seen by some as being a Nazi unit, while others argue that it fought only the Soviet Union that had previously occupied and annexed Latvia, and is not responsible for the Holocaust (since it was founded more than a year after the Jews of Latvia were murdered or sent to concentration camps) or any other Nazi war crimes, and should be viewed as a separate entity. It is not recognized as a criminal organization by the US. Even though up to 80–85% of people were conscripted, it was officially named Volunteer Legion to circumvent the Hague Convention of 1907 prohibiting drafting inhabitants of occupied territories by the occupying power.

=== In Latvia ===
Per announcement of the Latvian Ministry of Foreign Affairs, the government of Latvia does not recognize 16 March as an official remembrance day and has declared that Latvia commemorates its fallen soldiers on Lāčplēsis Day (11 November). As of 2018, people are allowed to commemorate the fallen on 16 March on their own private accord, but higher officials and members of the government do not participate at the commemorative events taking place in the Riga centre in their official capacity. The Latvian Ministry of Foreign Affairs has stressed that no Nazi uniforms, symbols, or slogans appear on this or other days in Latvia, as they are illegal.

On 16 March 2012, Efraim Zuroff during his visit to Riga to protest against the Legionnaire Day procession, stated in an interview with Latvian State television LTV1 that the "Latvian SS Legion was not involved in the crimes of the Holocaust" but also stated, as he has done every year since 1999, "although these units were not involved in crimes against humanity, many of their soldiers had previously served in the Latvian security police and had actively participated in the mass murder of civilians, primarily Jews."

Head of the World War II History Department of the Latvian War Museum Jānis Tomaševskis acknowledged that 11 Latvian Auxiliary Police battalions and Arajs Kommando, whose members had participated in the Holocaust, were eventually assigned to the Latvian Legion, but asserted that "there is no basis to declare that the Latvian Legion was related to the war crimes committed by previous military or paramilitary units". He describes how "[i]nflow of these persons in the legion to a certain extent delayed international court institutions to arrange fast arrest of war criminals", noting the case of Viktors Arājs who was arrested only in 1975 in Germany, but states, "[t]he fact that also war criminals were called in the legion does not make the entire legion a criminal unit."

According to 2017 research by the University of Latvia and SKDS, from 2012 to 2017, public support for Legionnaire Day had decreased from 38% to 33%. Researcher Mārtiņš Kaprāns noted a "more pronounced tolerance" and that "a favourable attitude towards the Lestene memorial has grown both among Latvians and Russians".

=== In Russia ===
Russia alleges that the Latvian Legion carried out punitive actions against partisans and the civilian population in the territory of German-occupied Latvia, Poland, Belarus, Ukraine, and Russia (such as Operation Winterzauber).

Director of Russia’s "Historical Memory" foundation Aleksandr Dyukov claims that the Latvian Legion had been involved in the mass killing of civilians, such as the Zhestianaya Gorka massacre, and numerous former members of the Latvian Legion had worked for American intelligence to pursue anti-Soviet propaganda.

=== Internationally ===
In 2011, the European Commission against Racism and Intolerance (ECRI) adopted a report on Latvia, expressing "concern as regards the authorization of certain public events to commemorate two incidents and the authorities' reaction in this connection. As concerns the first incident, every year, on March 16, a gathering commemorating soldiers who fought in a Latvian unit of the Waffen SS is held in the centre of Riga. In this connection, ECRI regrets that, in spring 2010, an administrative district court overruled a decision of the Riga City Council prohibiting this procession" and recommended "that the Latvian authorities condemn all attempts to commemorate persons who fought in the Waffen SS and collaborated with the Nazis. ECRI further recommended that the authorities ban any gathering or march legitimising in any way Nazism".

Institute for Strategic Dialogue had stated, "[c]laiming that members of the Estonian and Latvian SS units were voluntarily collaborating with Nazis oversimplifies history", explaining, "the vast majority of soldiers were conscripted against their will" and "[d]raft evasion was initially punishable by prison, and later punishable by death".

In 2013, United Nations special rapporteur on racism submitted a communication to Latvia concerning the events of 16 March. In 2018, the European Parliament adopted a resolution on the rise of neo-fascist violence in Europe, observing that "every year on 16 March thousands of people gather in Riga for Latvian Legion Day to honour Latvians who served in the Waffen-SS". In 2019, Canada condemned the event.

The organizers of the march are trying to present the members of the legion as freedom fighters who paved the way for Latvian independence but nothing could be further from the truth. The Nazis had absolutely no intention of granting independence to any of the Baltic countries and it is only because Nazi Germany lost the Second World War could Latvia regain its independence after the fall of the USSR. People who fought for victory of Third Reich should not be glorified as heroes – such a victory would have meant the end of Western civilization.

— Efraim Zuroff,

Leanid Kazyrytski has argued that, even though the Nuremberg Tribunal excluded Latvian Waffen SS units from the list of criminal organizations, the Latvian Legion possessed all the features attributed to a criminal organization by the Nuremberg Tribunal.

== Traditions ==
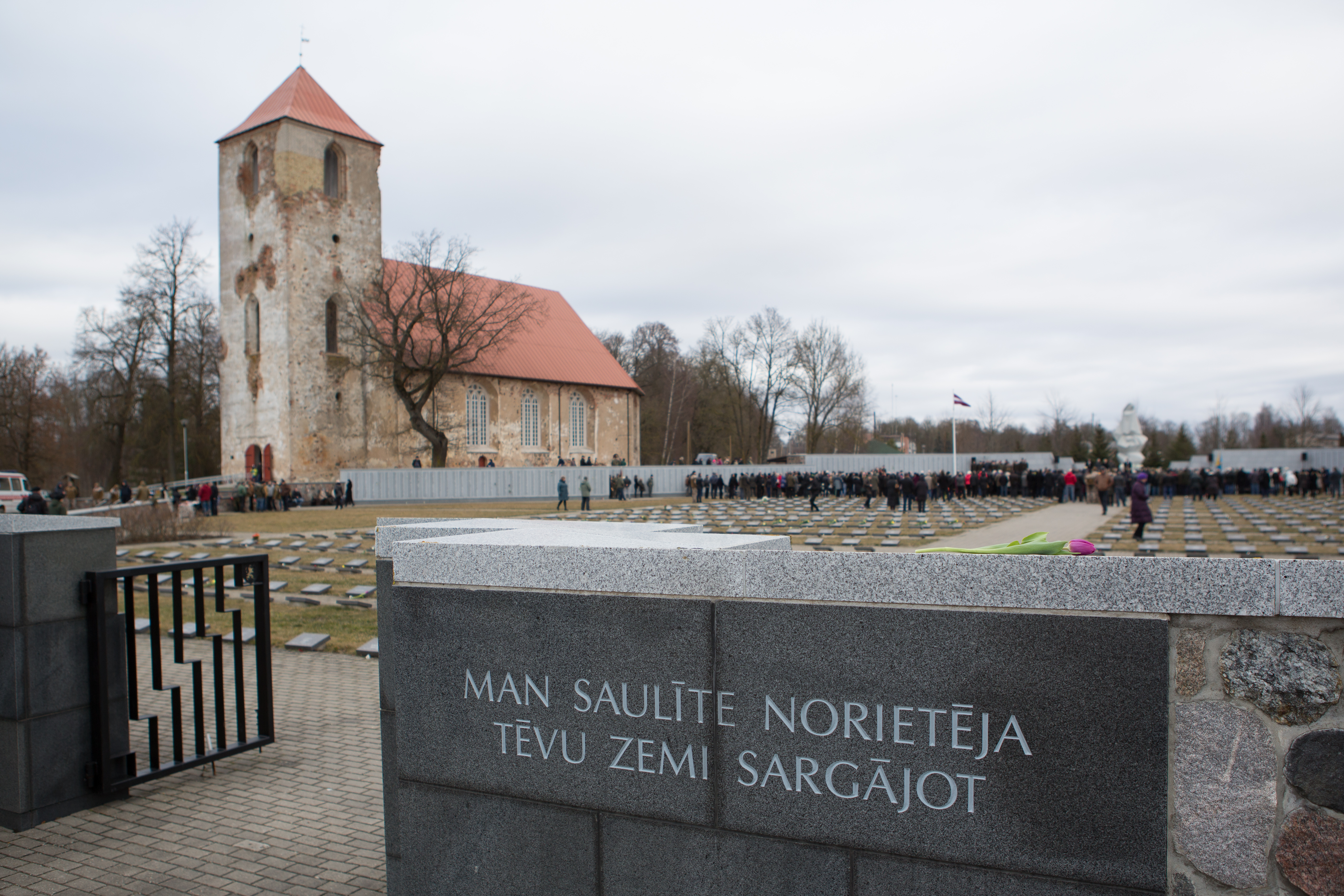
Remembrance event of the fallen soldiers at the Lestene war cemetery on 16 March 2015

Traditionally, a memorial service is held in Riga Cathedral, after which the participants go on a procession to the Freedom Monument where they lay flowers. Another ceremony receiving much less publicity takes place at the war cemetery in Lestene, Tukums Municipality.

== Participating organizations ==
Organizations whose members have been seen to participate in events:

- National Alliance – a right-wing populist party whose members traditionally organize a flag alley at the Freedom Monument when the procession arrives
- Gustavs Celmiņš Centre – an organization seeking to revive the ultranationalist Pērkonkrusts movement

=== Organizations that have demonstrated against the events ===
- National Bolshevik Party
- Anti-Fascist Committee of Latvia
- Latvian Russian Union
- Nochnoy Dozor
