= Grīziņkalns =

Neighbourhood of Riga, Latvia

Coordinates: 56°57′30″N 24°09′17″E

- Neighbourhood of Riga
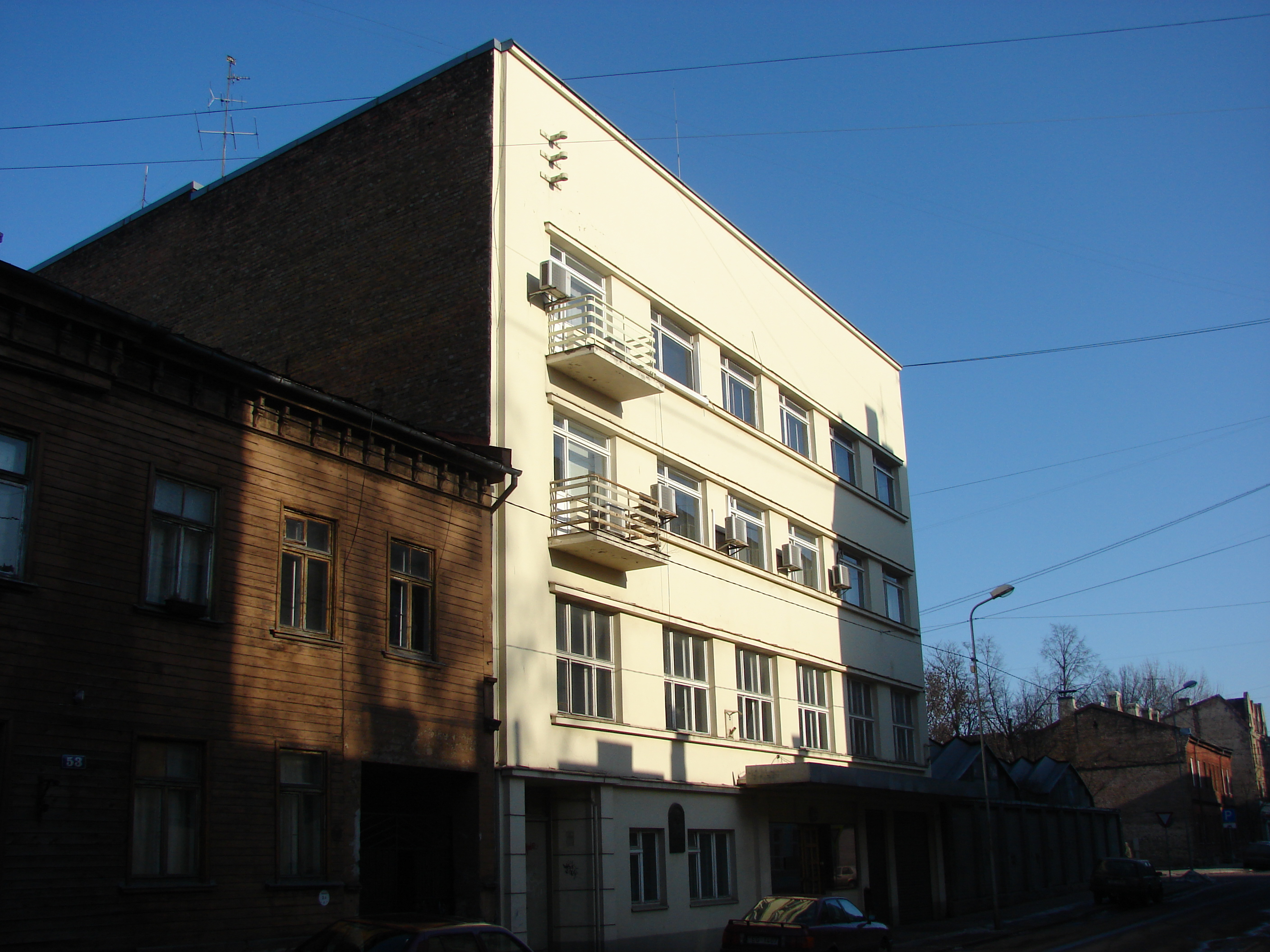
- Staburadze Confectionery Plant

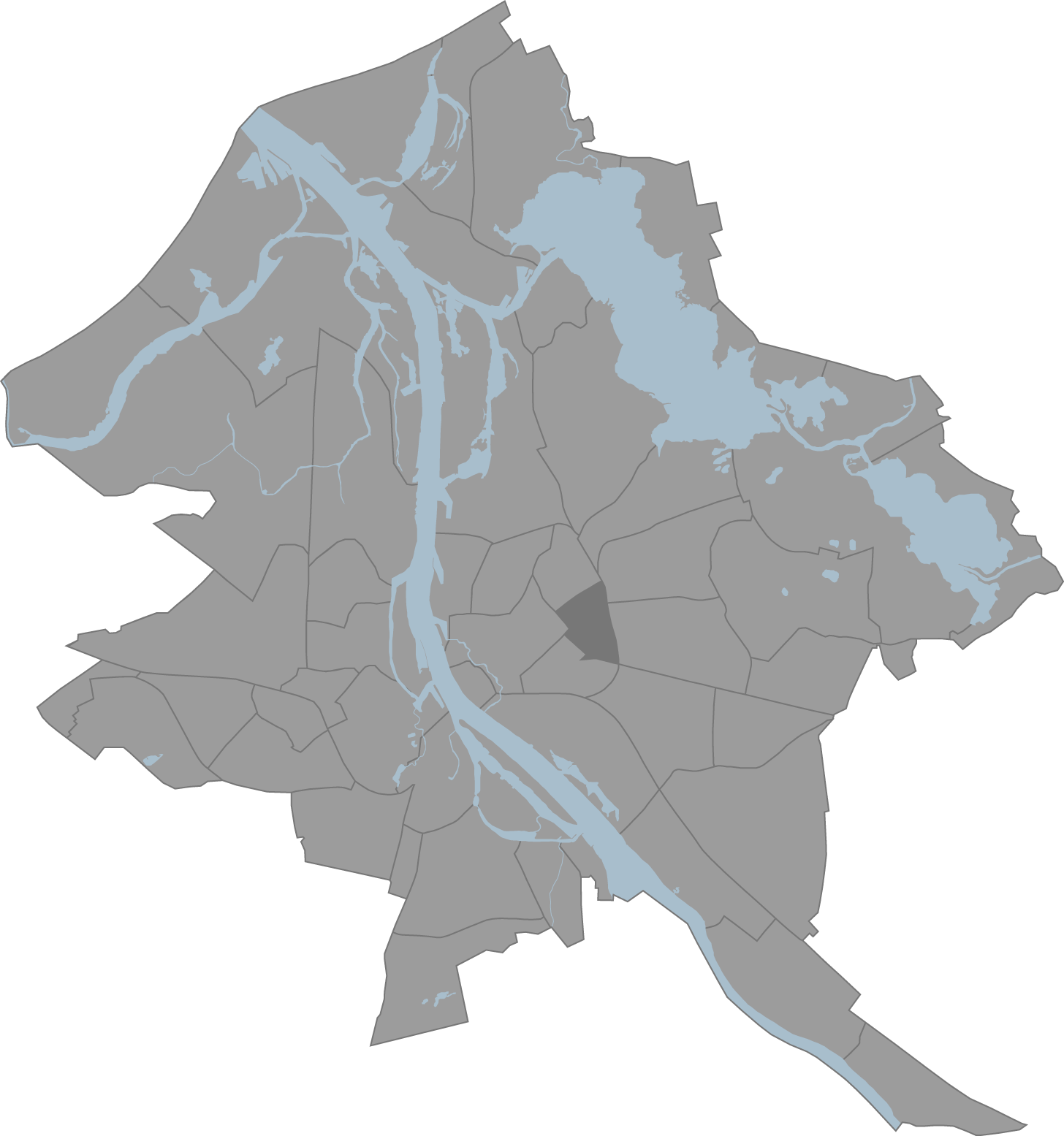
- Location of Grīziņkalns in Riga
- Country: Latvia
- City: Riga
- District: Latgale Suburb; Central District

Area
  - Total: 1.517 km^{2} (0.586 sq mi)

Population (2024)
  - Total: 11,858
  - Density: 7,817/km^{2} (20,250/sq mi)
- Postal codes: LV-1009, LV-1011, LV-1012
- Website: apkaimes.lv

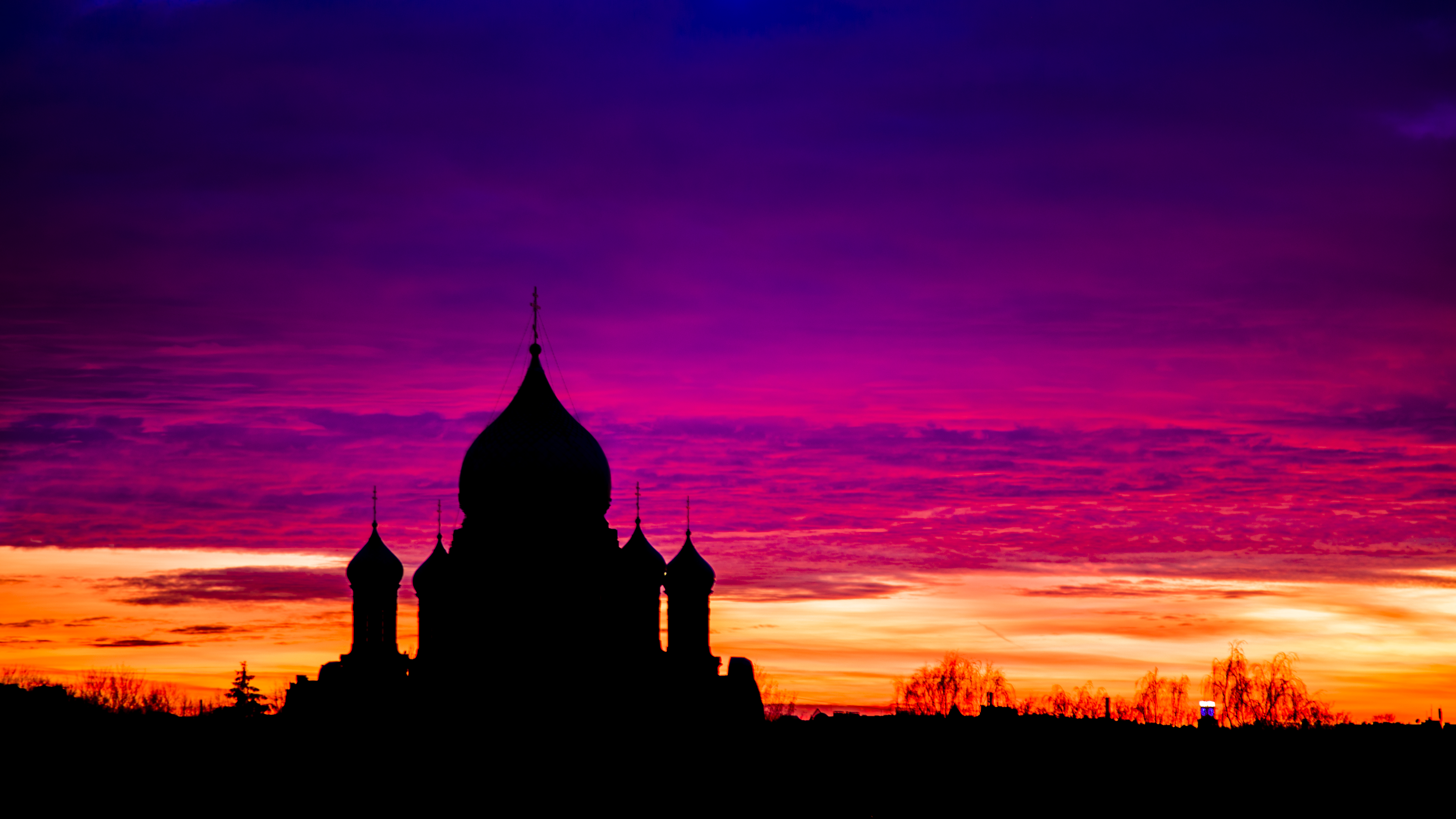
Orthodox cathedral

Grīziņkalns is a neighbourhood in Riga, the capital of Latvia. The Orthodox Holy Trinity Cathedral, Daugava Stadium and the Staburadze confectionery factory (a part of Orkla-owned Laima) are located in the area, and it is dominated by late 19th to early 20th century working class houses. Grīziņkalns is split between the city's Latgale Suburb and its Central District, with Aleksandra Čaka iela and the Jorģis Zemitāns Bridge serving as the dividing line.

Latvian writer Jānis Grīziņš described the working-class area of Grīziņkalns in his 1928 adventure story Vārnu ielas republika ('Vārnu Street Republic' or 'Crow Street Republic'), which then was used as the premise of the 1970 Soviet Latvian film of the same name (Vārnu ielas republika).

Grīziņkalns name comes from the wealthy merchant Griesen who bought a manor here in 1794. However, until the second half of the 19th century it was a quiet and secluded place dominated by sandy dunes and meadows. In the second half of the 19th century several big factories were opened along the newly built Pērnavas street, as a result many houses for workers were also built nearby. Since then this area became known as Griesenberg (Grīziņkalns in latvian). The highest spot in the neighbourhood is Grīziņkalns mound, a 24-meter high sand dune. Since 1903 there is public park in the neighbourhood.

For many years the neighbourhood was dominated by working class residents. They were very active during the Revolution of 1905 because many of its local leaders lived or worked in Grīziņkalns. Grīziņkalns park was later renamed Park of 1905, there is also monument dedicated to revolution in the park.

== Gallery ==
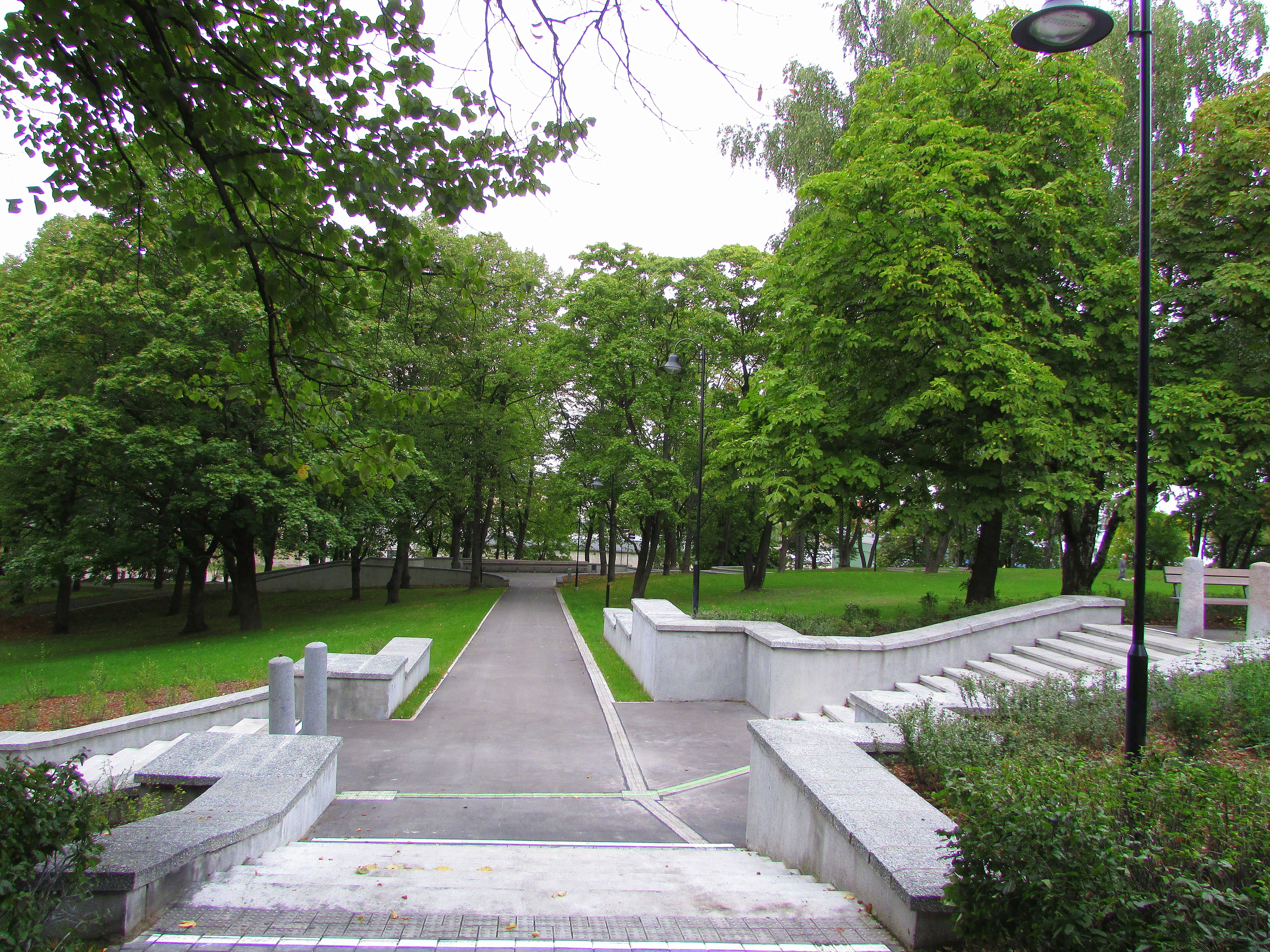
Grīziņkalns park

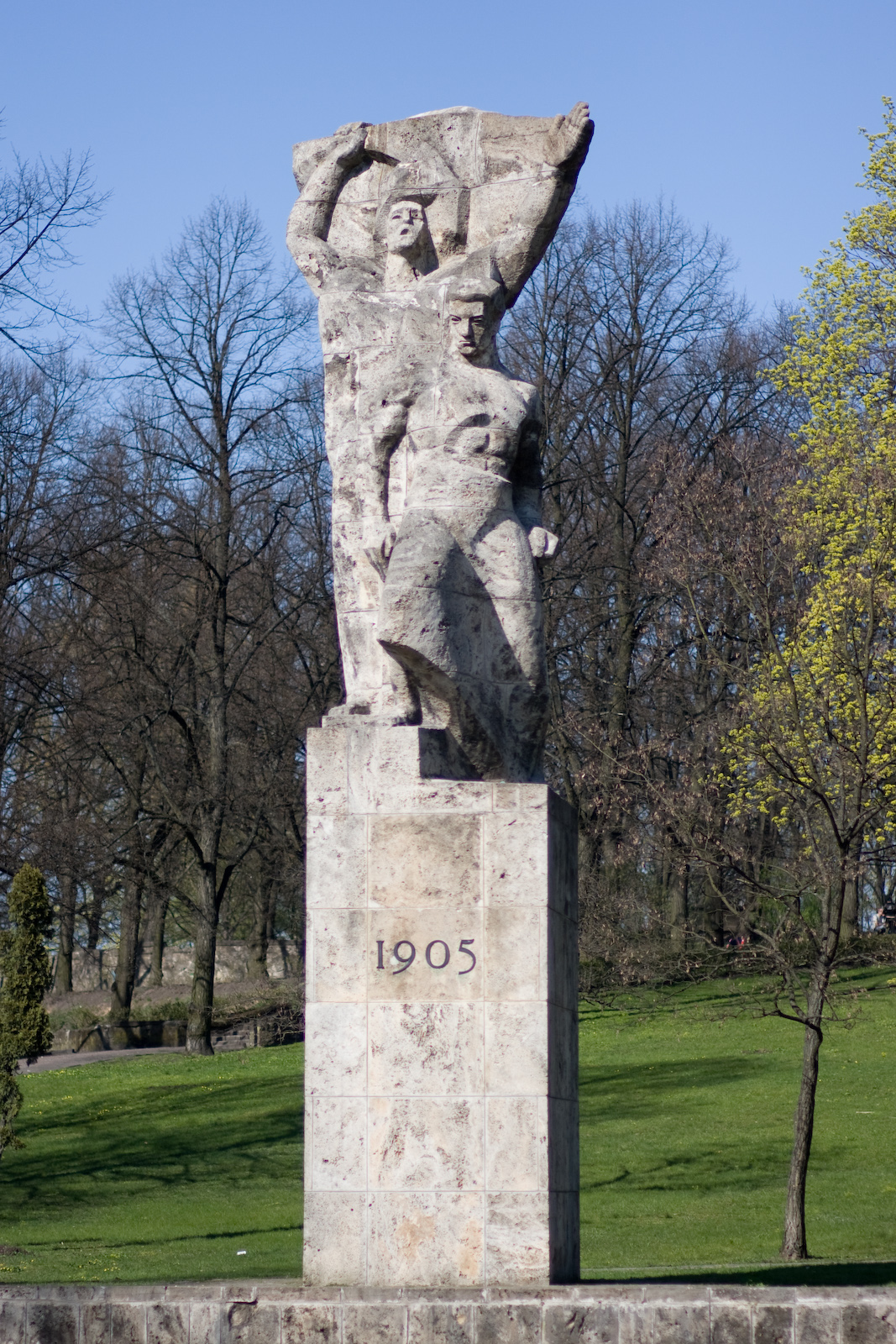
Monument to Revolution of 1905 in the Grīziņkalns park.

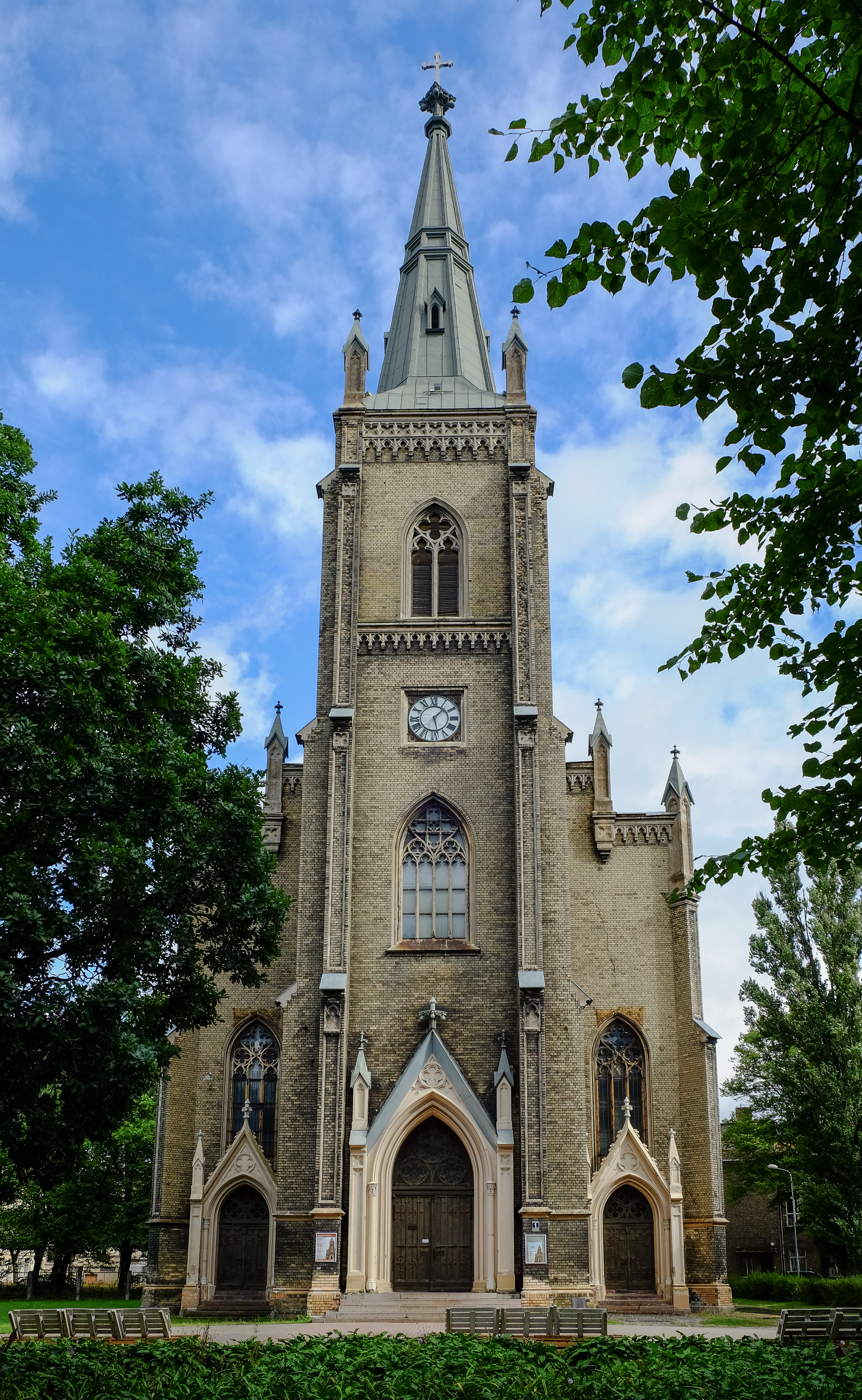
St. Paul lutheran church on A. Deglava street 1

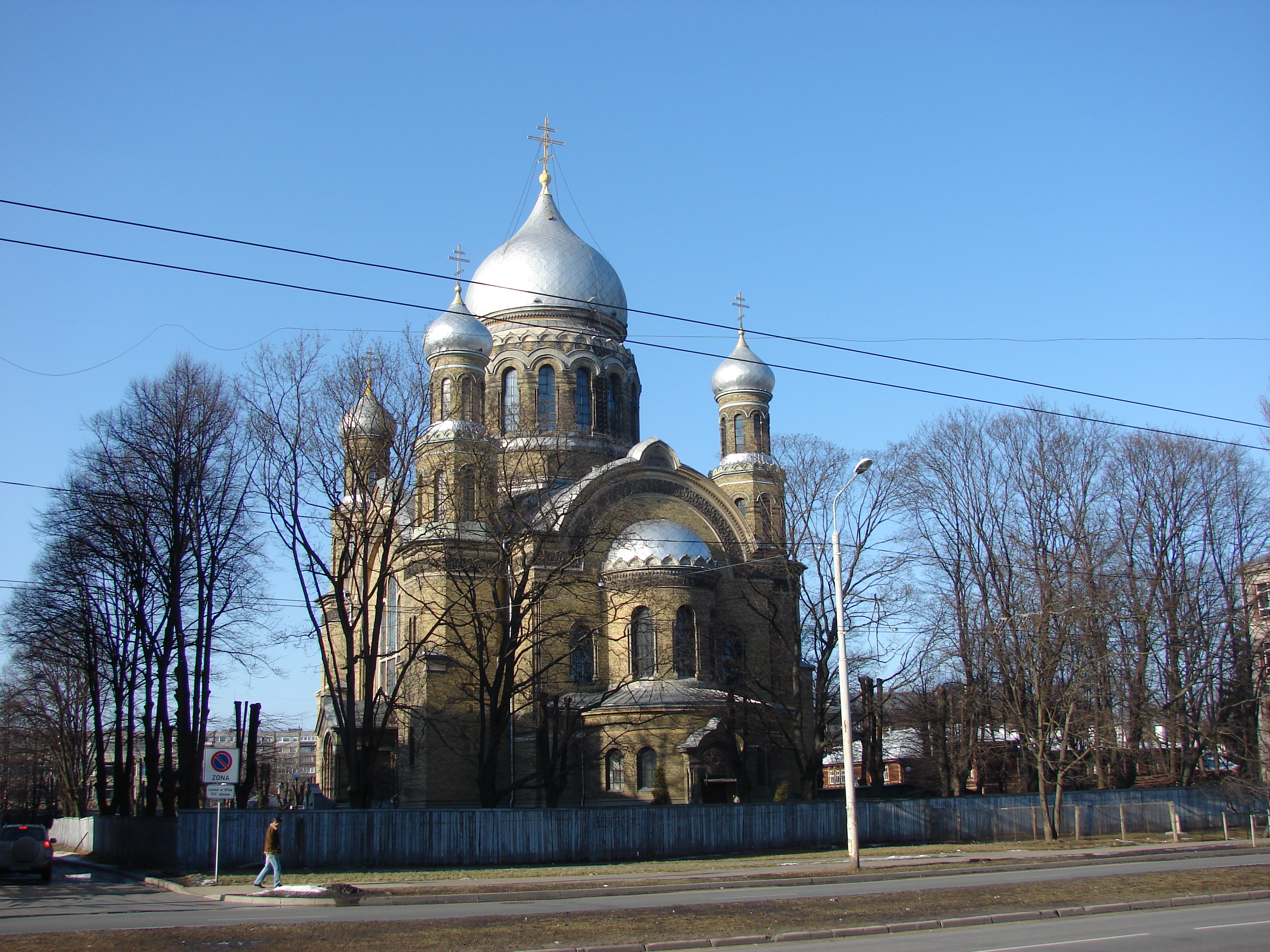
Holy Trinity orthodox church and monastery

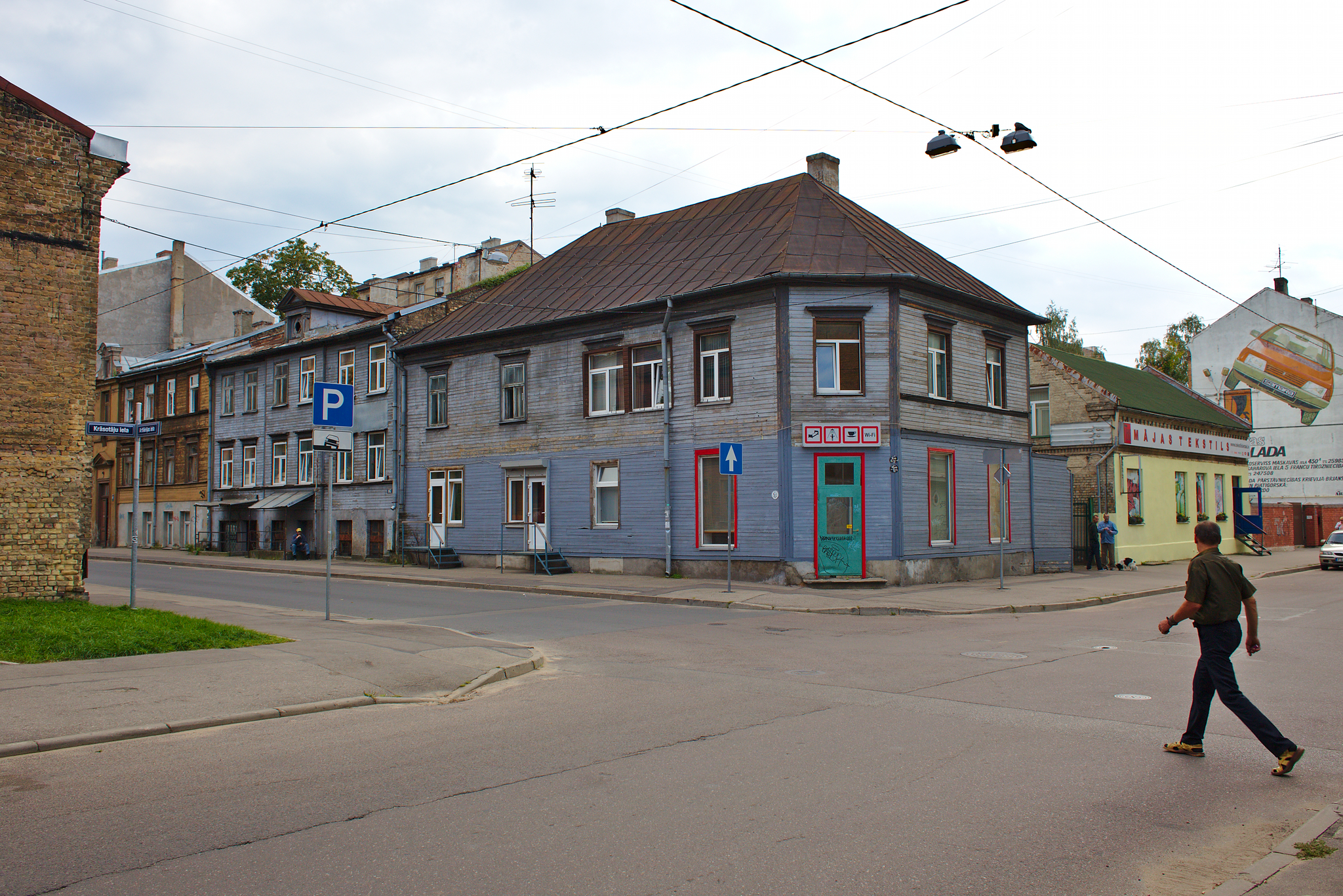
Typical worker houses on cross of Artilērijas and Krāsotāju streets.

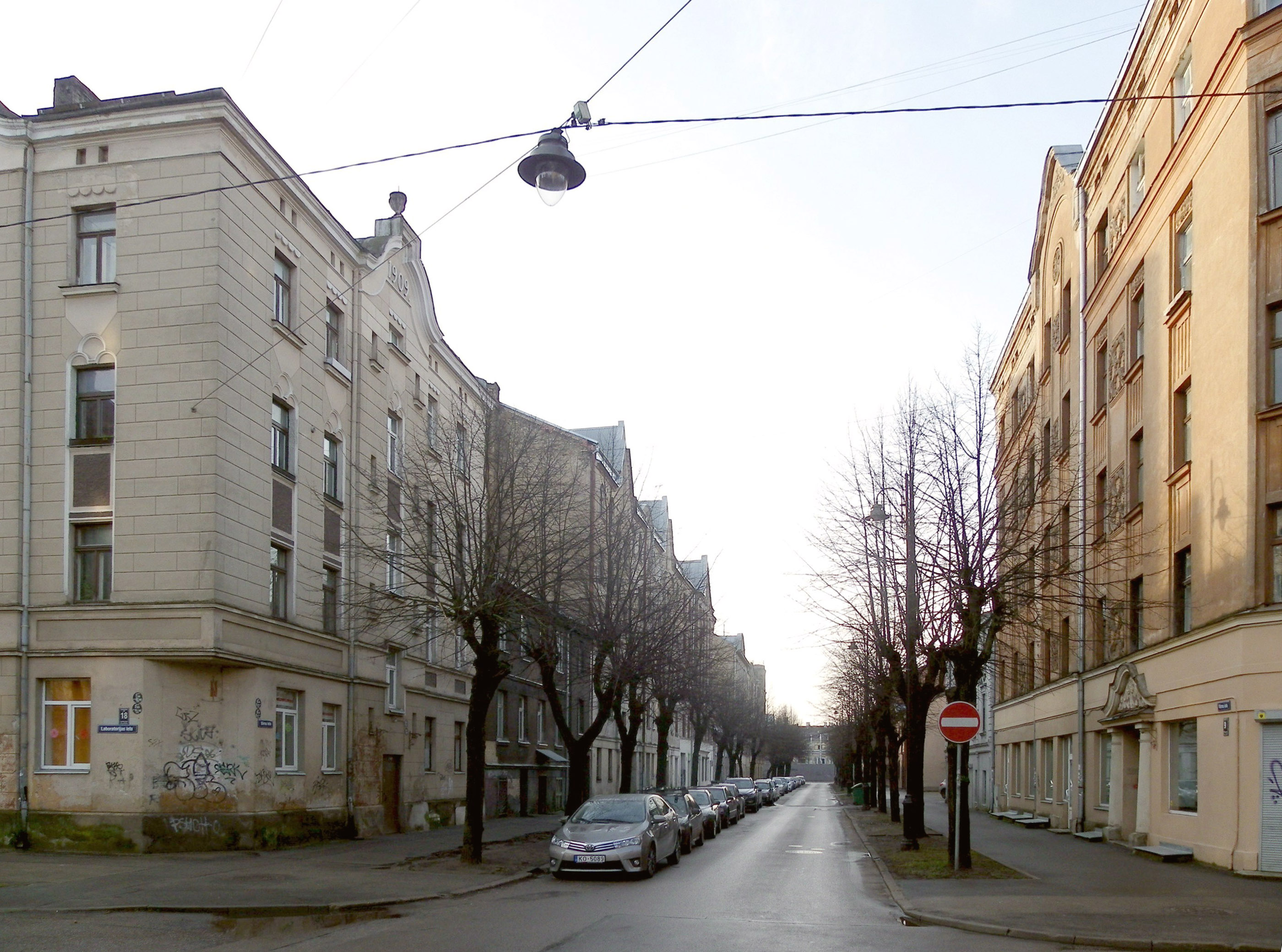
Vārnu street in Grīziņkalns

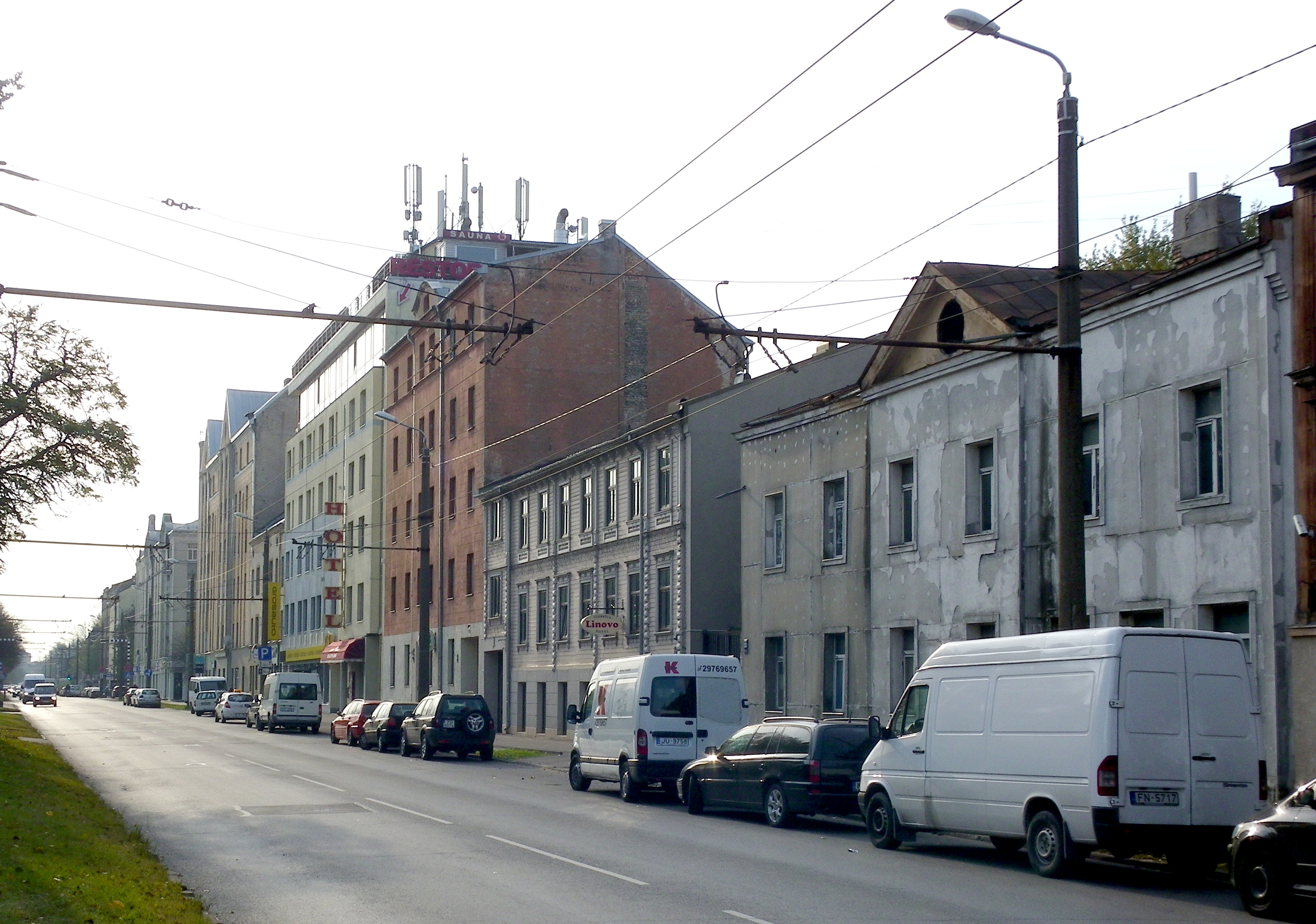
Pērnavas street across the Grīziņkalns park.
