= Ernests Štālbergs =

Latvian architect (1883–1958)

- Born: 3 September 1883; Liepāja, Russian Empire (now Latvia)
- Died: 12 June 1958 (aged 74); Rīga, Latvian SSR
- Known for: Architecture
- Movement: Neo Classicism, Functionalism
- Awards: Order of Three Stars

Ernests Štālbergs (1883–1958) was a Latvian architect whose works are in the Neoclassical and the functionalistic styles.

Štālbergs trained at the Kazan Art School from 1902 through 1904. His notable works include the auditorium at the University of Latvia (1929–36) and the ensemble of the Freedom Monument in Riga (1930–35; with sculptor Kārlis Zāle).

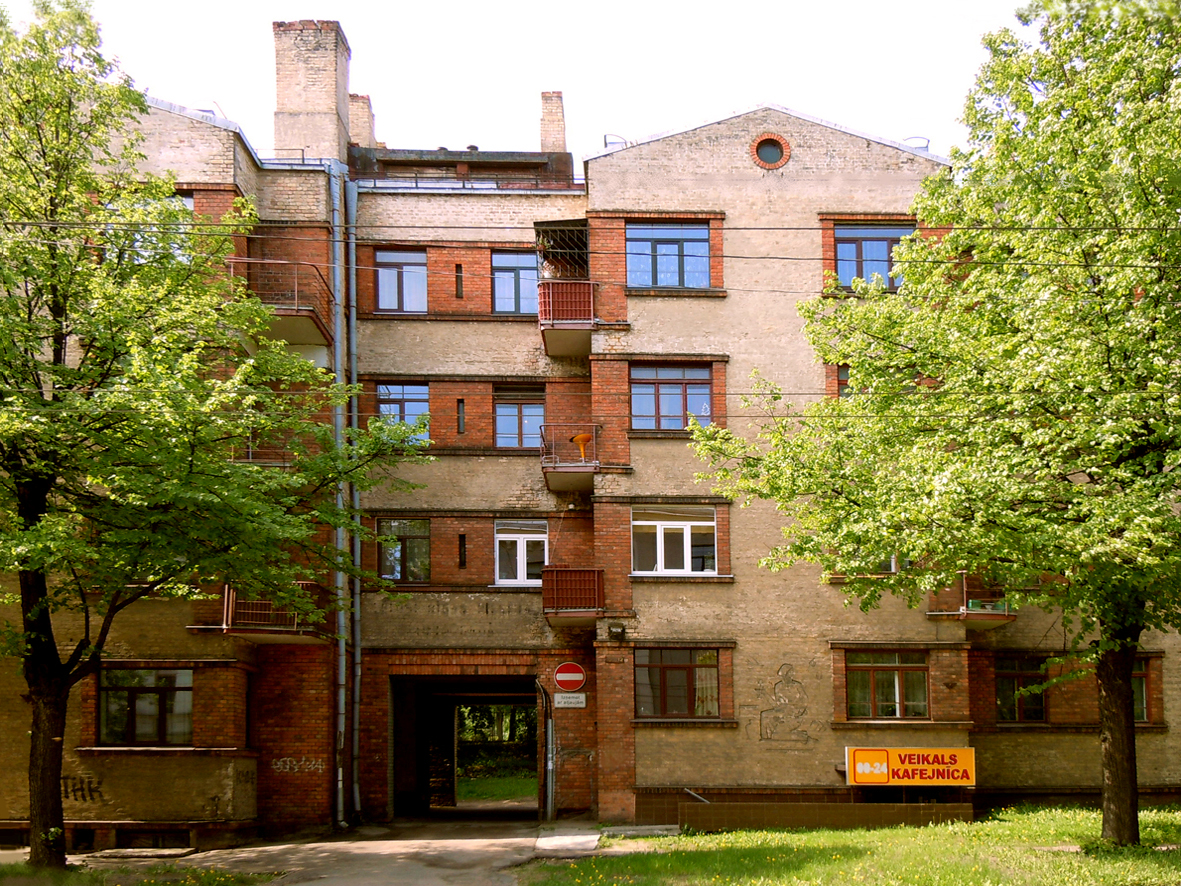
Apartment house on the Lomonosova str. Riga (1930)
