= Laima Clock =

Street clock in Riga, Latvia

- Laimas pulkstenis
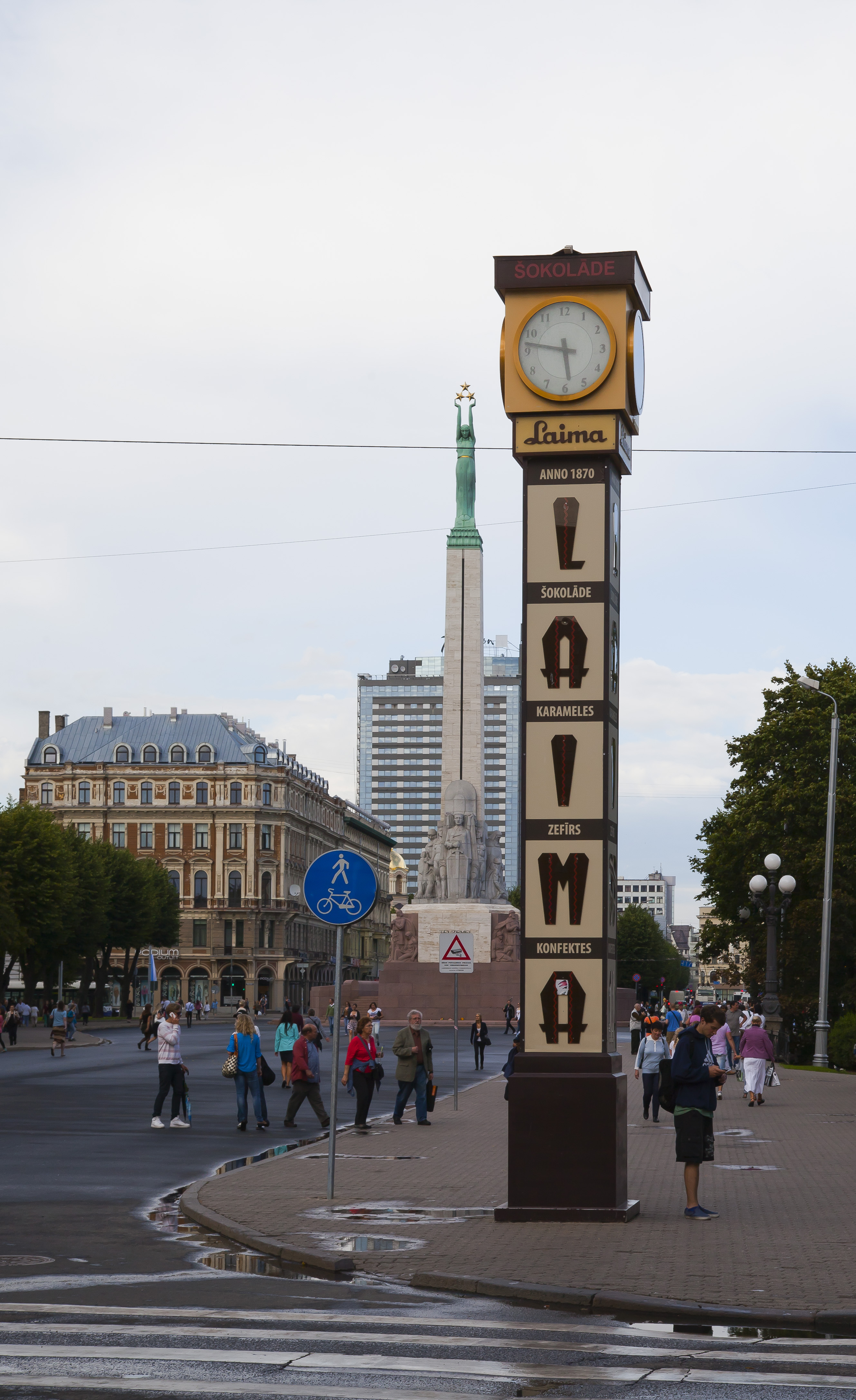
- The clock and the Freedom Monument
- Interactive map of Laima Clock
- Location: The street Brīvības bulvāris
- Coordinates: 56°57′02″N 24°06′43″E
- Completion date: 1924

The Laima Clock (Latvian: Laimas pulkstenis) is a landmark in central Riga, Latvia. Its location between the Old Town and the Centre commercial district has made it a landmark of the city.

== History ==
The clock was completed in 1924 and initially was called the Big Clock (Lielais pulkstenis), but began to carry the name of the Laima confectionery company in 1936. During the Latvia SSR it was used as a political information stand. In 1999 the Laima Clock was fully reconstructed and its original design restored. On December 12, 2012, at 12:00 the clock rang for the first time since its installation.

Beginning from November 27, 2017, the clock was reconstructed again. The new style clock designed by Arvis Sproģis was unveiled on December 29, 2017. The reconstruction cost a total of 106,000 euros and was covered by Orkla Group as a gift for 100th Anniversary of the Latvian Republic.

In 2012, construction of another Laima-branded clock was completed in Sigulda.
