= Laima (confectioner) =

Company based in Riga, Latvia

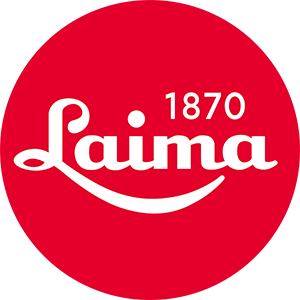
- Industry: Chocolatier
- Founded: Latvia (1870)
- Founder: Theodor Riegert
- Headquarters: Riga, Latvia
- Key people: Toms Didrihsons (Chairman of the Board, Orkla Latvija)
- Products: Confectionery
- Revenue: ▼LVL7.71 million (FY 2011)
- Net income: ▲LVL681.9 thousand (FY 2011)
- Number of employees: 620
- Parent: Orkla Group
- Website: laima.lv

Laima is the largest producer of confectionery in Latvia. It is named after Laima, the goddess of fate in Latvian mythology and is headquartered in Riga.

== History ==
The company traces its origins to the 19th century when the Theodor Riegert Company was one of the largest confectioners in the Baltic Provinces of the Russian Empire. Despite the loss of most of the Russian market after World War I and the Latvian War of Independence, the company maintained its major market position domestically following Latvia's independence in 1918.

The current company name was adopted in 1925 after a merger with two brothers Eliyahu and Leonid Fromenchenko (also spelled Fromchenko). In 1933 Eliyahu Fromchenko founded Elite in Israel at Ramat Gan.

In 1937, the company was sold to the Government of Latvia. During both the 1930s and Soviet occupation of Latvia, Laima was the main chocolatier in Latvia, with L.W. Goegginger (later renamed Uzvara) being the main producer of hard candies.

After Latvia restored its independence, Laima merged with both Uzvara and cookie, wafer, and cake manufacturer Staburadze in the 1990s to become a single company under the Laima name, keeping the two as sub-brands. AS Laima and AS Staburadze existed as legal entities until 2016, when they and AS Latfood (the producer of Ādažu čipsi snacks) were merged into Orkla Latvija.

== Corporate affairs ==
Unlike similar regional producers of national brands, such as Lithuania's Karūna, Sweden's Marabou, and Norway's Freia, Laima initially wasn't bought out by an international player like Kraft Foods. Ownership of Laima was controlled by Nordic Food, owned by local businessman Daumants Vītols. After introducing Laima shares to the Riga Stock Exchange in December 2006, the controlling owners decided to once again make the company private, taking it off the market on 13 July 2007.

The parent company of Laima, SIA NP Foods, which was established in 2009, was acquired by Orkla Group in August 2014 under its subsidiary SIA Orkla Confectionery & Snacks Latvija (SIA Orkla Latvija since 2020).

== Brand recognition ==
The product in Laima's current range with the longest history is the chocolate candy Serenāde, the recipe for which has remained unchanged since 1937.

In Riga, one of the major landmarks is the Laima Clock, near the Freedom Monument. This is a classic meeting place for people in Central Riga.

As a publicity gesture, in 2007, Laima gave the inhabitants of Ruhnu island in the Gulf of Riga a 40 kg statue of a bear made of chocolate, to commemorate a brown bear that had swum over, presumably from the Latvian mainland, to the Estonian island.

== See also ==
- List of bean-to-bar chocolate manufacturers
