= Holy Trinity Cathedral, Riga =

Church building in Riga, Latvia

Holy Trinity Cathedral
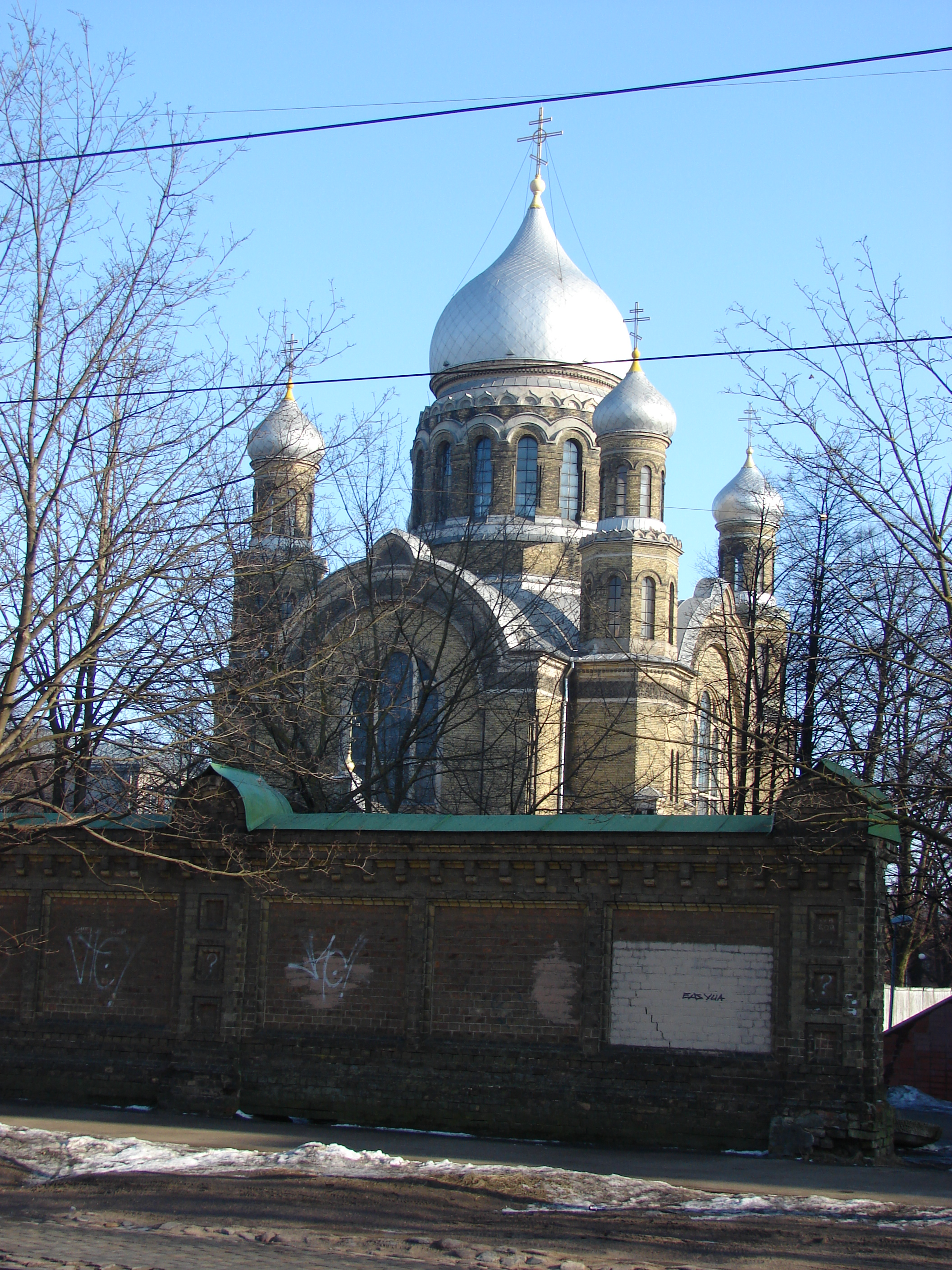

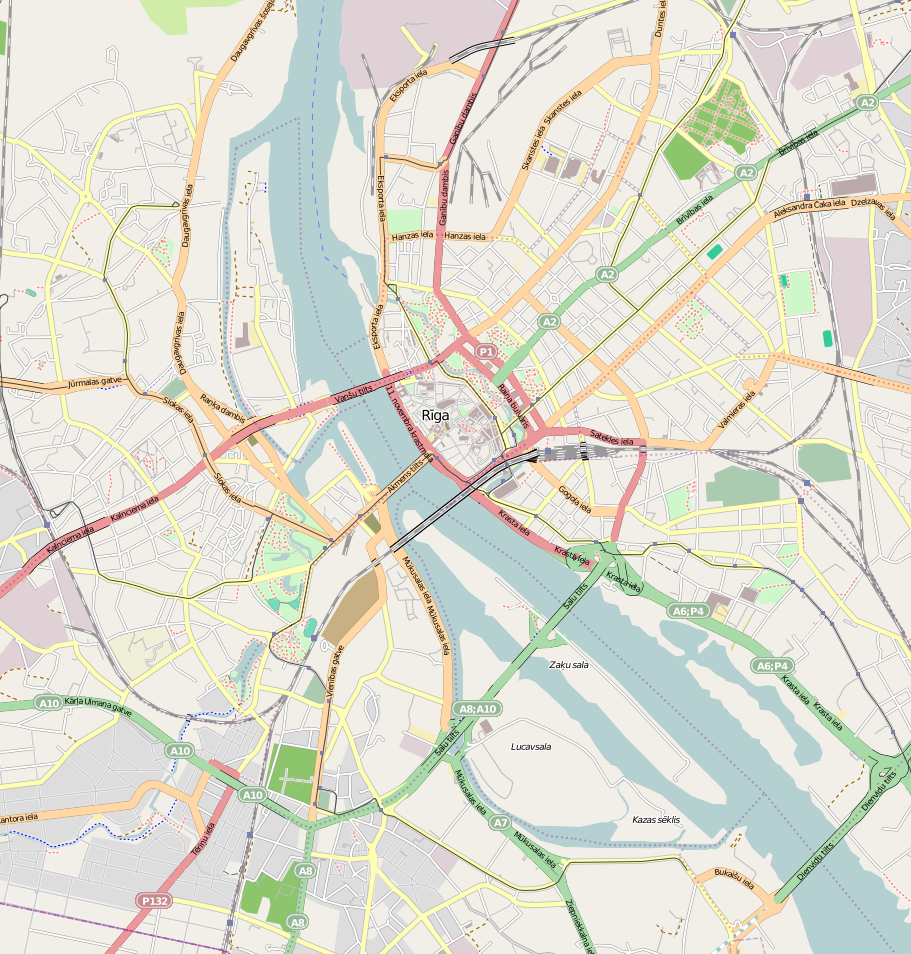
- Location within Riga
- 56°57′47.98″N 24°8′52.15″E
- Location: Riga
- Country: Latvia
- Denomination: Eastern Orthodox

Holy Trinity Cathedral (Latvian: Svētā Trīsvienības katedrāle) is an Eastern Orthodox cathedral in Riga, the capital of Latvia. The cathedral is situated at the address 126 Krišjānis Barons Street.
