= Lestene Parish =

Parish of Latvia

- parish of Latvia
- Coat of arms

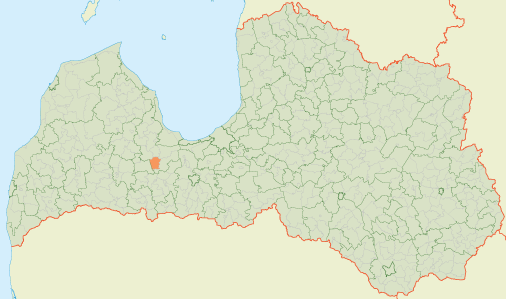
- Coordinates: 56°46′51″N 23°08′11″E
- Country: Latvia

Population (1 January 2026)
  - Total: 517

Lestene Parish (Latvian: Lestenes pagasts) is an administrative unit of Tukums Municipality in the Semigallia region of Latvia. The administrative center is Lestene.

A historic church featuring ornate Baroque woodcarvings is located in Lestene.

== Towns, villages and settlements of Lestene parish ==
- Blāzma
- Burtnieki
- Lestene
- Mariņmuiža

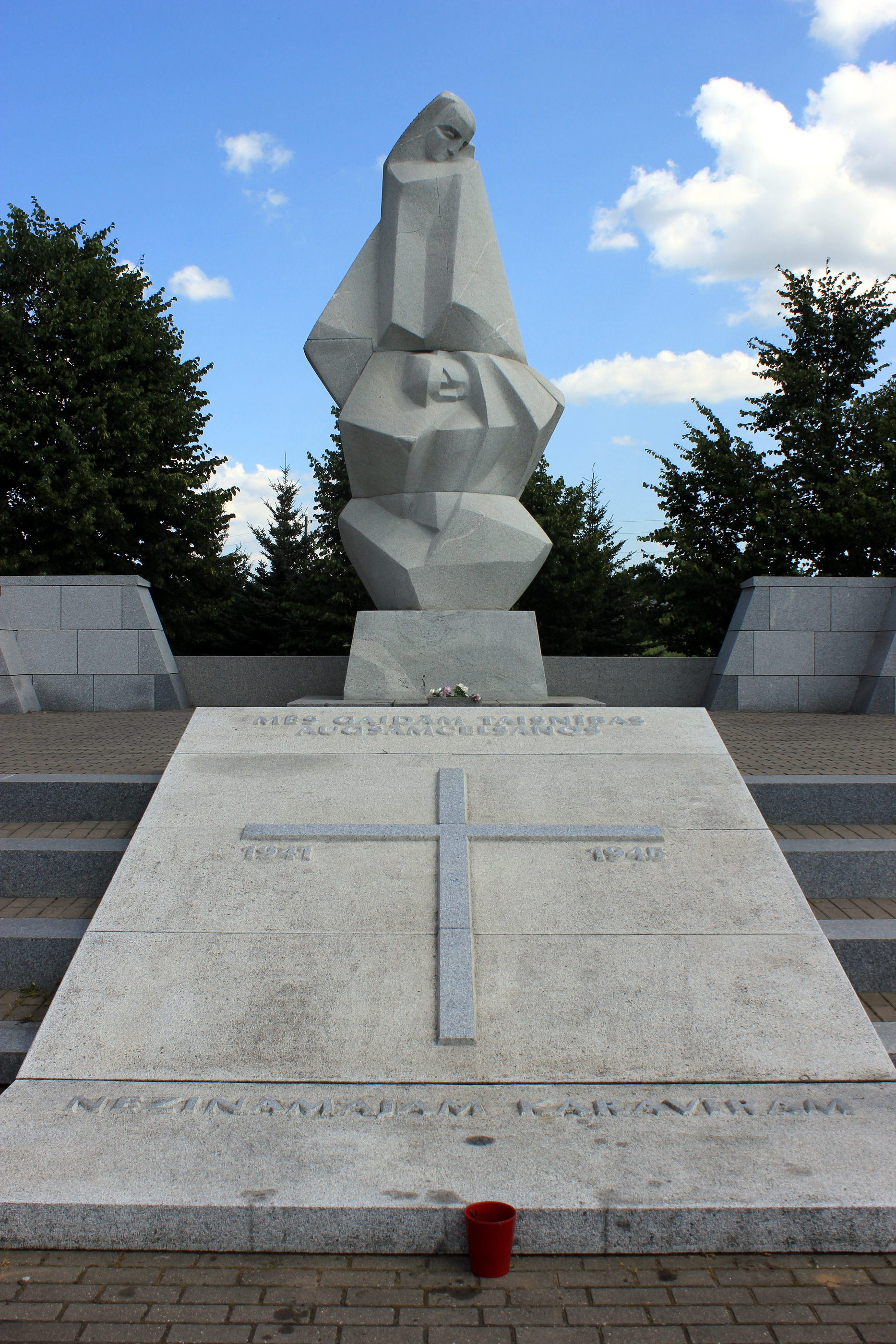
Sculpture (2000) by Arta Dumpe in Lestene cemetery
