= Statue of Alexander Pushkin, Riga =

Sculpture in Riga, Latvia

Statue of Alexander Pushkin
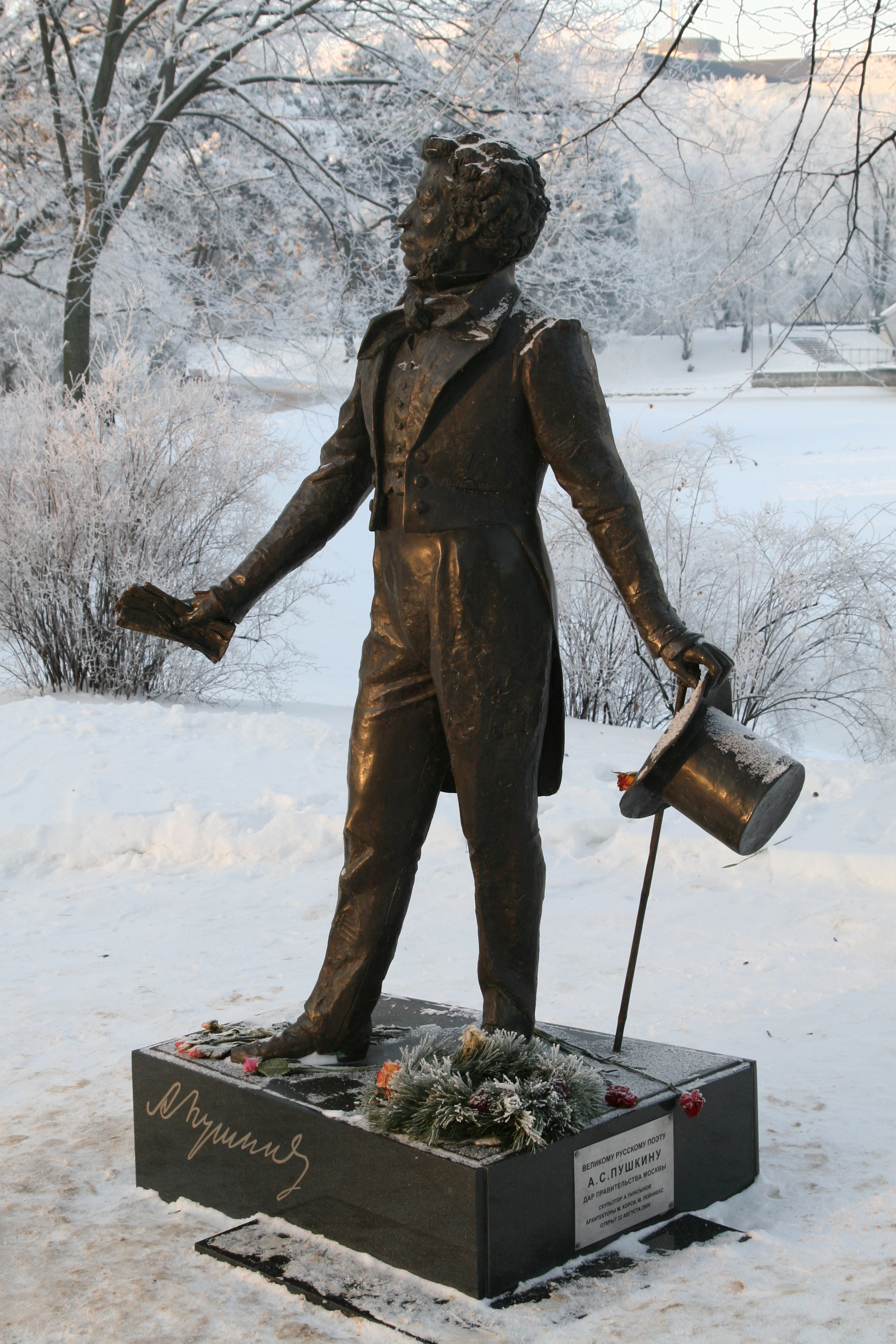
- Statue in Kronvalda Park, Riga (2010)
- Artist: Alexander Tartynov
- Year: 2009
- Medium: Bronze (statue), granite (base)
- Subject: Alexander Pushkin
- Condition: Removed in 2023
- Location: Riga, Latvia; 56°57′21″N 24°6′15″E

The Pushkin Statue in Kronvalds Park in Riga, Latvia, was erected in 2009 as a gift from the city of Moscow and removed in 2023. It was made by sculptor Alexander Tartynov.

Although unveiled on 22 August 2009 with support from the Russian Embassy and then–Mayor Nils Ušakovs, the statue's installation lacked the approval of the National Inspectorate for Cultural Monuments and the Riga Historic Centre Preservation and Protection Council. The statue became increasingly controversial following the 2022 Russian invasion of Ukraine. On 18 November 2022, the Embassy of the Russian Federation in Latvia posted pictures of the monument, painted with white and red paint, on social media. The State Police of Latvia started an investigation into this case. On 25 November 2022, a petition called "Demolition of the Pushkin monument" was posted on the community petition platform ManaBalss.lv.

In early March 2023, the Riga City Council Committee on Monuments voted to relocate the sculpture, a decision subsequently endorsed by the council's governing coalition. On 12 March 2023, the Latvian Russian Union organized a protest in front of Riga Town Hall against the statue's proposed removal attended by around 200 people. On 26 April 2023, the ruling coalition of Riga City Council—through vice-chair Linda Ozola's office manager, Kaspars Adijāns—voted to relocate the sculpture "with all haste", directing a survey of alternative sites but setting no firm deadline. This move followed a recommendation in early March by the City's Monuments Council to remove six Soviet-era monuments (including Pushkin's) on the grounds that they glorified the former regime. The Kods Rīgai bloc had pressed for the statue's removal by 4 May, calling out its illegal installation and its use as a tool of Russian soft power. On 30 May 2023, the Riga Monuments Agency removed the statue from the park and transferred it to a storage facility, pending its handover to the museum of the Latvian Union of Artists.
