= Kārlis Zāle =

Latvian sculptor

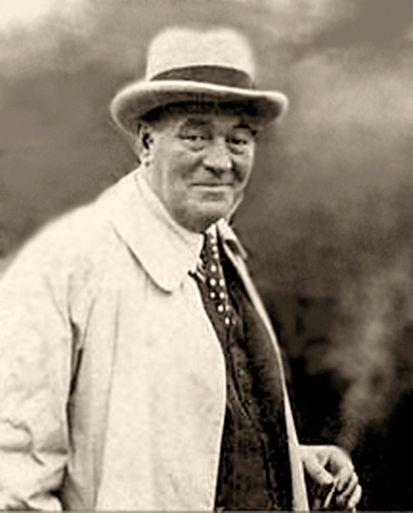
- Zāle in 1935
- Born: 28 October 1888; Mažeikiai, Russian Empire
- Died: 19 February 1942 (aged 53); Inčukalns, Reichskomissariat Ostland
- Known for: Sculpture
- Notable work: Freedom Monument

Kārlis Zāle (28 October 1888 – 19 February 1942) was a Latvian sculptor.

Zāle was born in Mažeikiai, but grew up in Liepāja. After training in Russia at the Kazan Art School under Alexander Matveyev and in Germany, he returned to Riga in 1923, where he both worked in sculpture and taught it. He is best known for his monumental sculptures, including the massive main gates at Brothers' Cemetery and the Freedom Monument in Riga.

He died in Inčukalns, Latvia.

He was awarded the Latvian Order of the Three Stars 2nd Class on 15 November 1935.

== Gallery ==
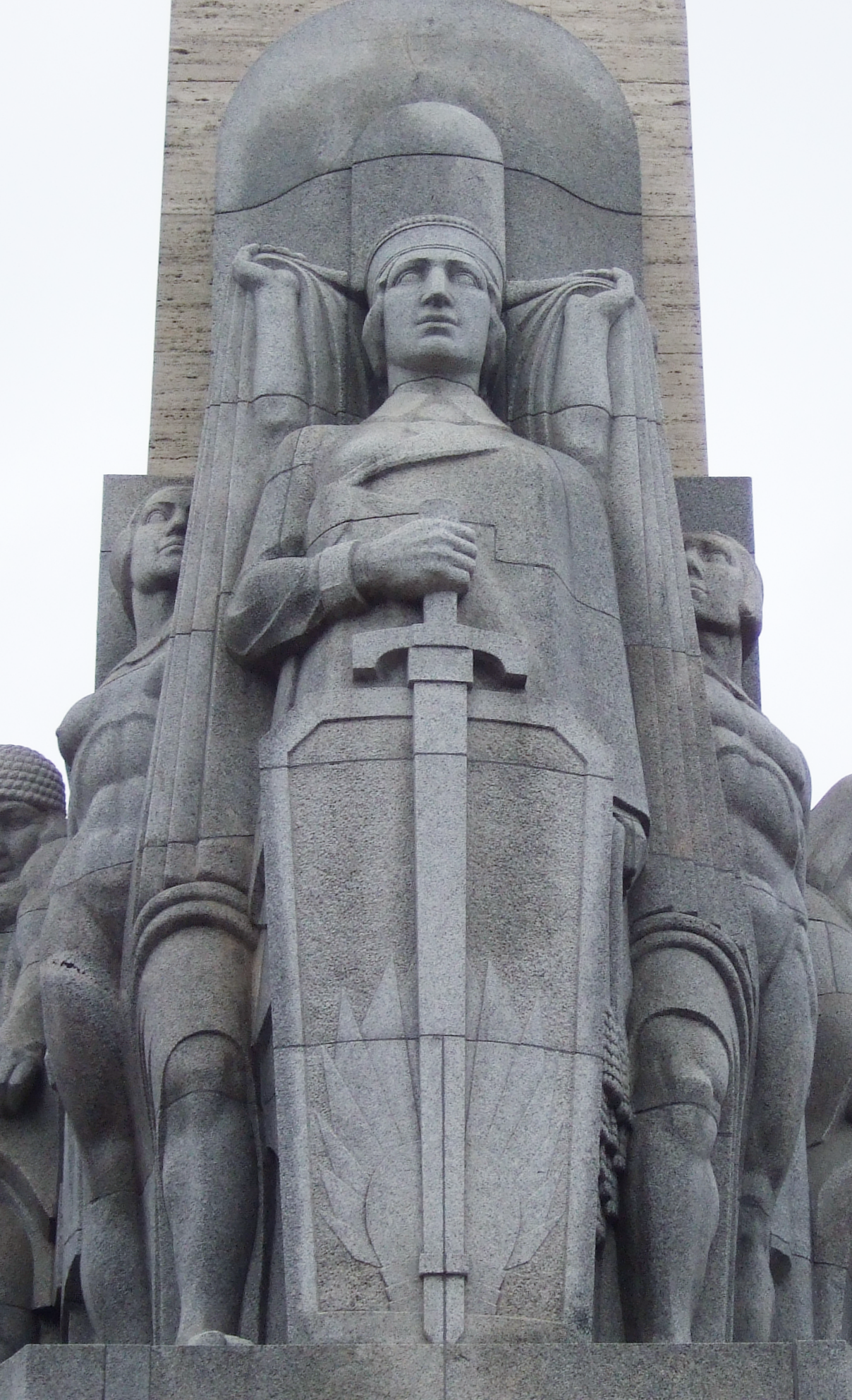
Freedom Monument, Riga

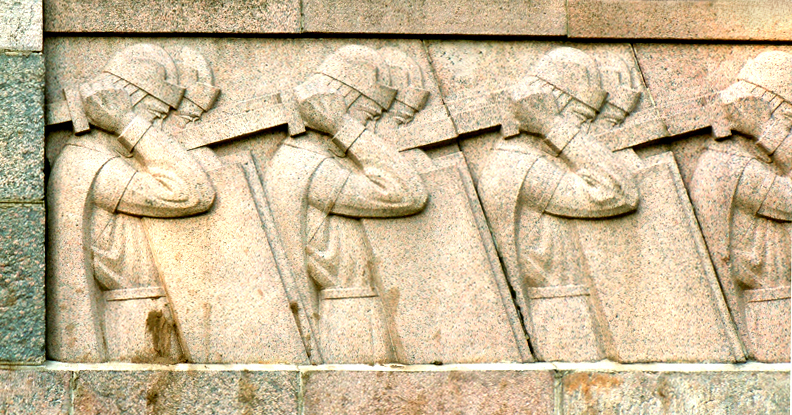
Detail, Monument to the Soldiers of the 6th Infantry Regiment, Sudrabkalniņš (Silver Hill), Riga

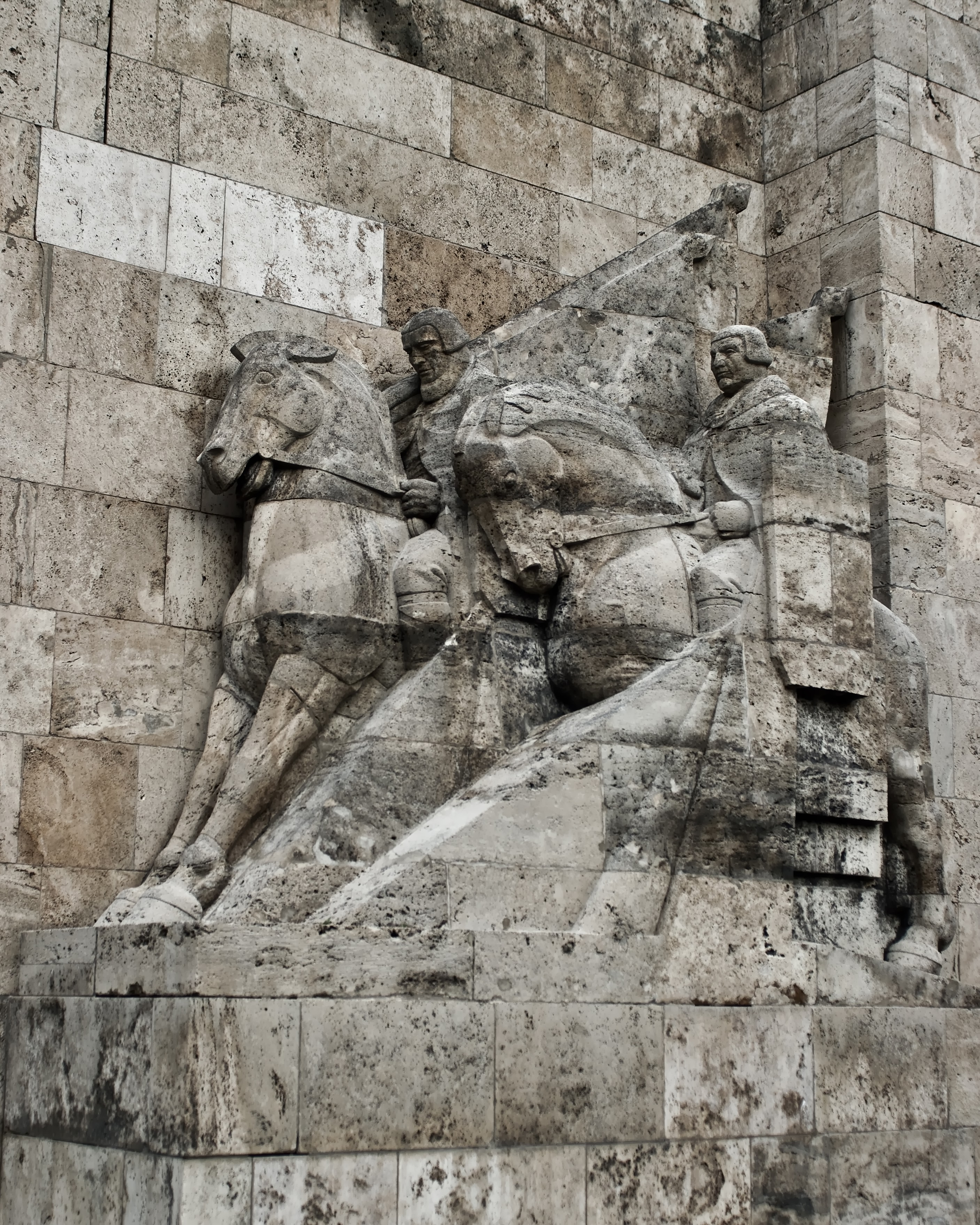
Main gate, Brothers' Cemetery (Riga)

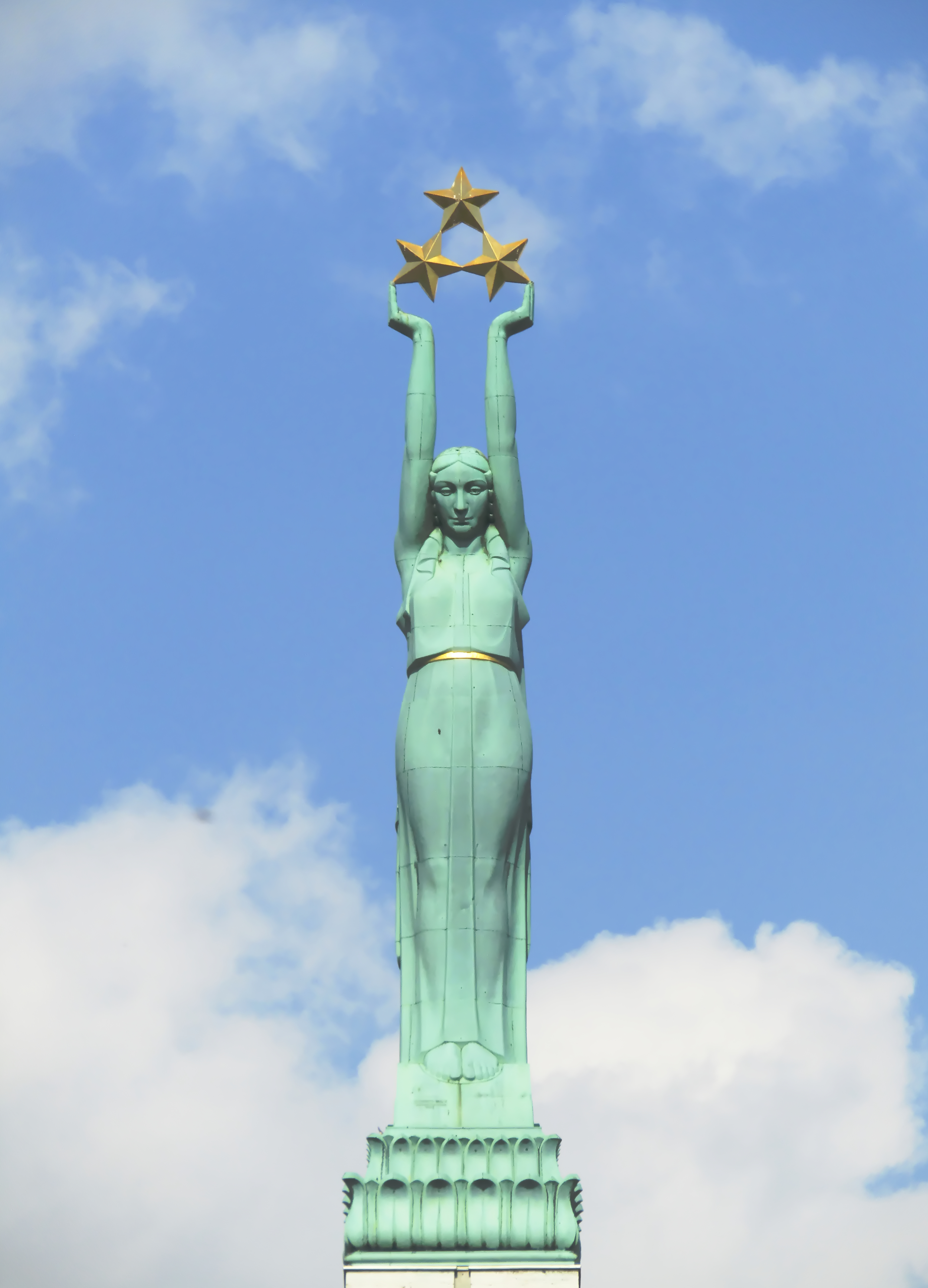
Liberty atop the Freedom Monument
