= Administrative divisions of Riga =

Administrative divisions of Riga, Latvia

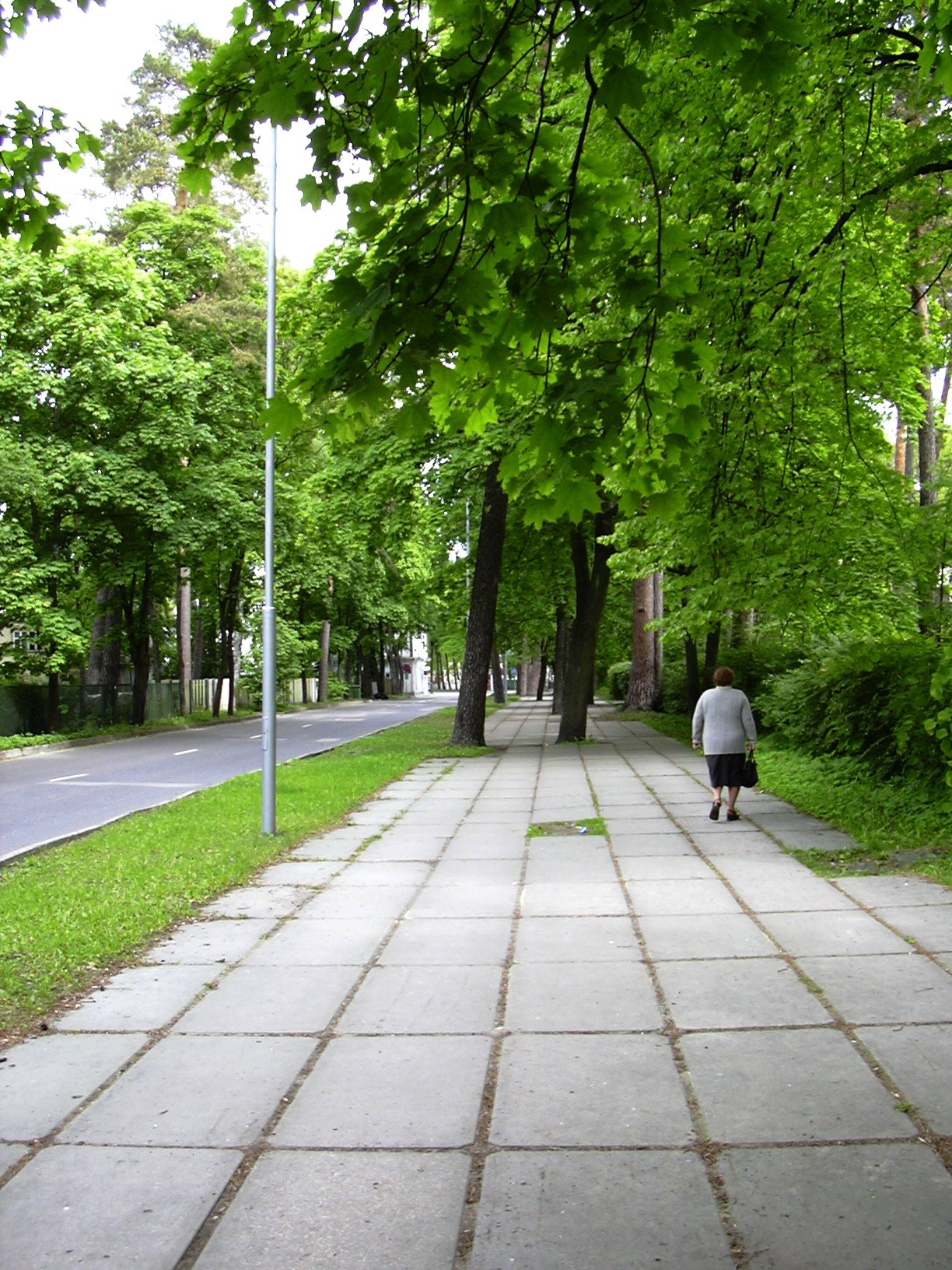
Left-bank Riga is distinguished by its green streets and large parks.

The administrative divisions of Riga consists of six official administrative entities: Central District, Kurzeme District, Latgale Suburb, Northern District, Vidzeme Suburb and Zemgale Suburb. Three entities were established 1 September 1941, and another three were established in October 1969. The current names were confirmed 28 December 1990.

There are also semi-official lower level administrative units – 58 neighbourhoods (Latvian: apkaimes) – introduced gradually from 2007 to 2012, when they were initially introduced by the Riga City Council Development Agency as city planning and local identity units. While the plan to give official status to the neighborhoods has been dormant since 2010, the neighborhoods have become the more frequently used unit used by both the municipality and the inhabitants.

== Administrative divisions ==
Statistical overview of the administrative divisions of Riga
Entity	Area	Population
Central District	3 km^{2} (1.2 sq mi)	26,466
Kurzeme District	79 km^{2} (31 sq mi)	134,817
Latgale Suburb	50 km^{2} (19 sq mi)	197,166
Northern District	77 km^{2} (30 sq mi)	81,972
Vidzeme Suburb	57 km^{2} (22 sq mi)	173,124
Zemgale Suburb	41 km^{2} (16 sq mi)	106,068

The city of Riga is divided into six administrative entities: Central, Kurzeme and Northern Districts and the Latgale, Vidzeme and Zemgale Suburbs.

Three of these entities were established 1 September 1941, and were later called Proletariat, Kirov and Moscow districts (Vidzeme Suburb, Central District and Latgale Suburb). October 1969, further three districts were established, these were October, Lenin and Leningrad districts (Northern District, Zemgale Suburb and Kurzeme District). The current names of the six administrative entities of Riga were confirmed 28 December 1990 at the time of the Third Latvian National Awakening.

The largest entity when it comes to area is Kurzeme District with 79 square kilometres (31 sq mi), and the smallest is Central District with 3 square kilometres (1.2 sq mi). The most populated entity is Latgale Suburb with 197,166 inhabitants, and the least populated is Central District with 26,466 inhabitants.

=== Territorial divisions ===
The total area of Riga is 307.17 square kilometres (118.60 sq mi), of which 67 square kilometres (26 sq mi) or 21.8% are residential areas, 52.45 square kilometres (20.25 sq mi) or 17% are industrial facilities, 24.64 square kilometres (9.51 sq mi) or 8% are streets, 57.54 square kilometres (22.22 sq mi) or 19% are parks and 48.50 square kilometres (18.73 sq mi) or 15.8% consists of water bodies.
