= Centrs, Riga =

Neighbourhood of Riga, Latvia

Coordinates: 56.95904°N 24.109712°E

Centrs
- Neighbourhood of Riga
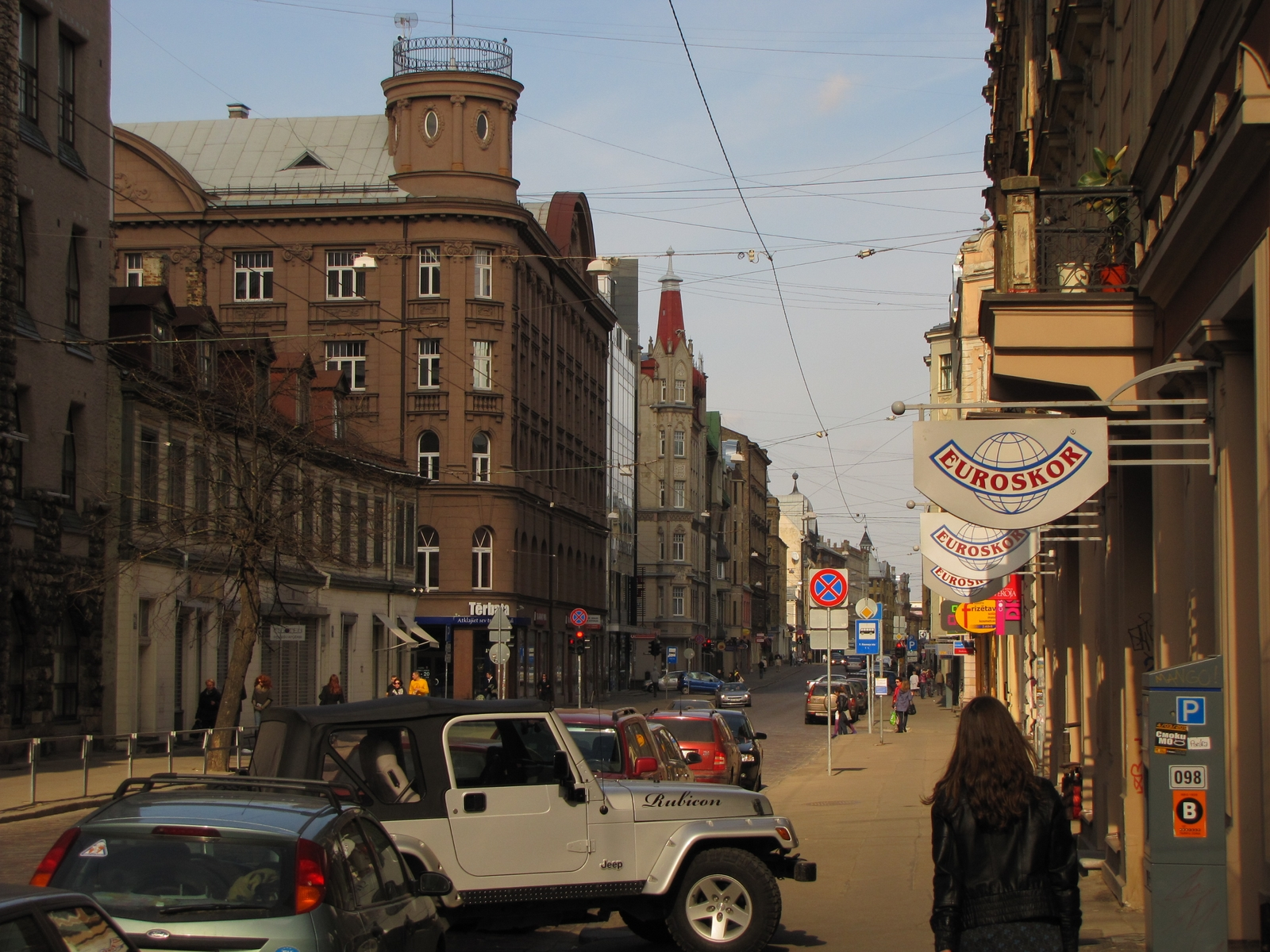
- View of Tērbatas iela in Centrs

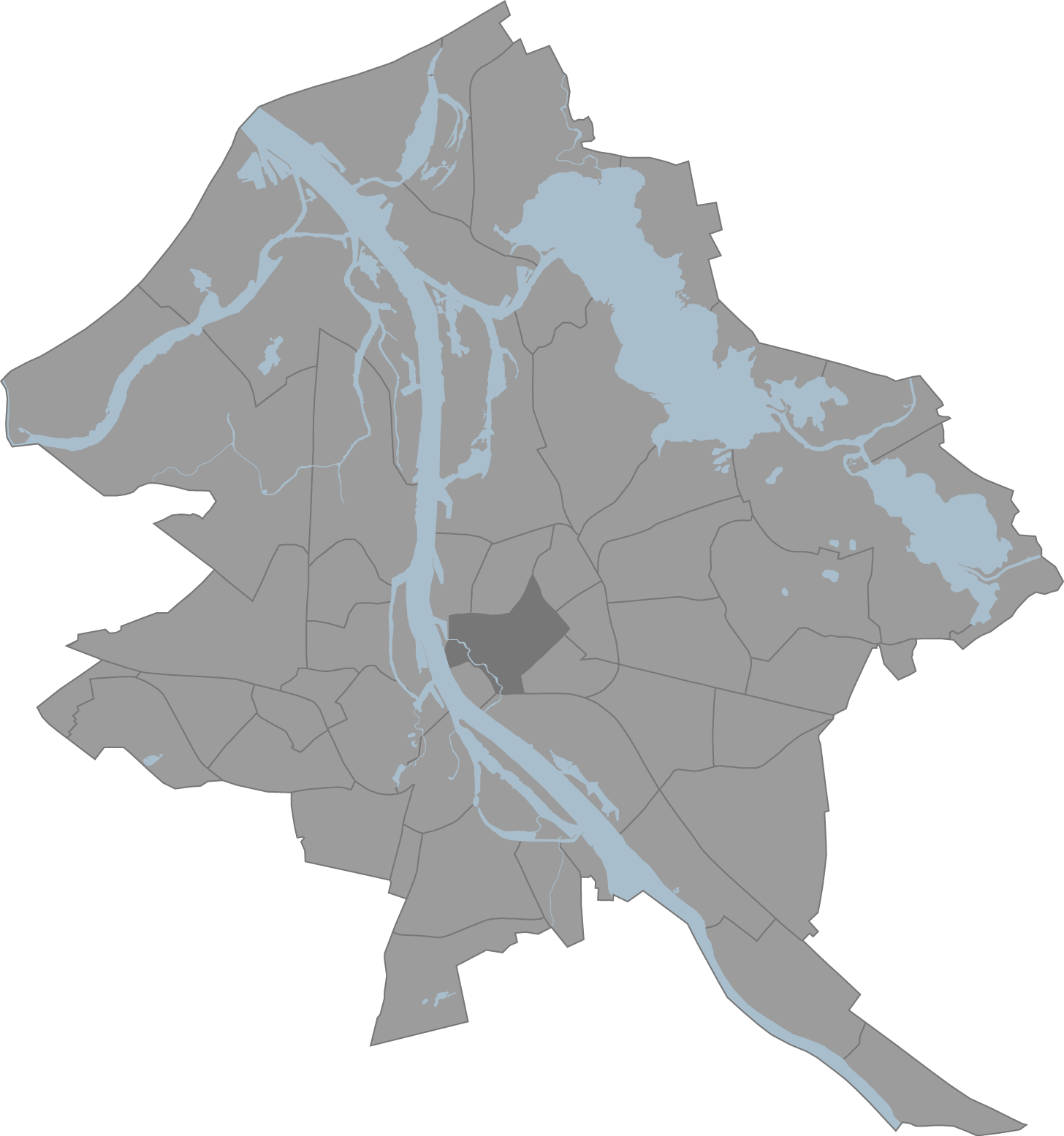
- Location of Centrs in Riga
- Country: Latvia
- City: Riga
- District: Central District; Northern District; Vidzeme Suburb; Latgale Suburb

Area
  - Total: 3.732 km^{2} (1.441 sq mi)

Population (2024)
  - Total: 31,711
  - Density: 8,497/km^{2} (22,010/sq mi)
- Website: apkaimes.lv

Centrs ("The Centre") is a neighbourhood of Riga, the capital of Latvia, which includes the central part of the city minus Old Riga. Much of it is administered as a part of the city's Central District, while parts are included within the Northern District and the Vidzeme and Latgale suburbs.

The area is a part of the Historic Centre of Riga UNESCO World Cultural Heritage entry. Art Nouveau architecture features heavily in the area due to reconstruction and expansion around the turn of the 20th century.

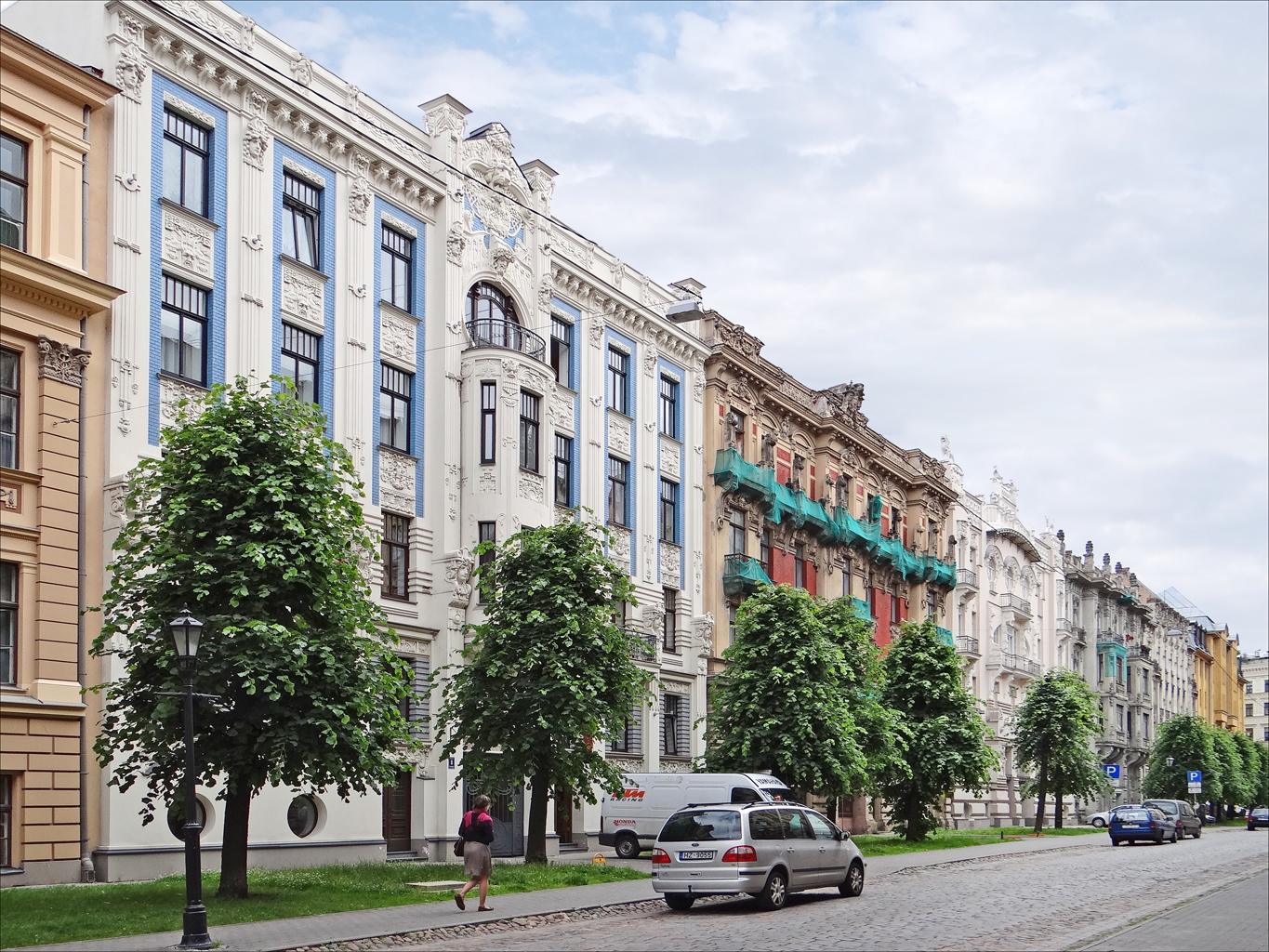
Art Nouveau buildings on Alberta iela
