= Riga hostel fire =

2021 fire in Riga, Latvia

- Date: 28 April 2021
- Location: Merķeļa iela 8, Riga, Latvia; 56.948990°N 24.119960°E
- Type: Fire
- Deaths: 9
- Injuries: 8
- Property damage: Hostel

On 28 April 2021, a fire at a hostel in Riga, Latvia, killed nine people and wounded eight others.

== Background ==
Hostels in Latvia were allowed to operate during the COVID-19 pandemic.

The hostel building was located in the commercial center of Riga, and marketed as Japanese Style Centrum Riga with 22 rooms. However, local authorities said after the fire that it was technically a private apartment and lacked the necessary fire safety and other permits. The hostel was crowded and some guests who stayed there in late 2020 and early 2021 said the conditions inside were poor. Reviews of the location mentioned small rooms, long term residents living alongside visiting tourists, people sleeping in the stairs and some rooms with no windows or ventilation.

The local public broadcaster released that police and the fire officials had been aware of fire-safety and COVID-19 compliance issues at the location since March 2021 and that officials had fined the business €500. In February 2021, officials who wanted to carry out a fire safety inspection were refused entry. The day prior to the fire, another individual was found dead in the hostel after a suspected drug overdose.

== Fire ==
Shortly after 4:30 am the fire broke out in Japanese Style Centrum, an illegal hostel on the fifth floor of a block of flats in the Latvian capital Riga. The fire brigade were called at 4:43 am. By the time of the arrival of the Latvian State Fire and Rescue Service the fire had spread to the sixth floor and roof. A survivor of the fire stated that they were awoken by an explosion and saw an orange light shining underneath the door to their room, and they had to evacuate by crawling on their hands and knees.

The fire killed eight people - some of whom were foreign nationals - and injured another nine people with an additional 15 individuals evacuated. Deputy Police Chief Andrejs Grisins told reporters that due to the injuries sustained by those that died in the fire DNA tests would be needed to confirm their identities.

== Aftermath ==
The Mayor of Riga, Mārtiņš Staķis, said the unauthorised hostel would be closed down. A criminal investigation into the fire was opened on the day it occurred.

== See also ==
- 2021 Kharkiv fire
- List of building or structure fires
- Timeline of Riga
