= Riga City Theater =

Theatre in Riga, Latvia

Riga City Theater (Latvian: Rīgas 1. pilsētas teātris; German: Rigaer Stadttheater) was the first permanent theater in the city of Riga in Latvia, founded in 1782. It was the first permanent theater in Latvia and the Baltic.

It hosted both theater as well as opera performances and concerts. It is the origin of the current Latvian National Opera. It was a center of culture in the Baltic region, and Richard Wagner (1837–39), Franz Liszt (1842), Clara Schumann (1844), Anton Rubinstein (1844) and Hector Berlioz (1847) where all employed there at some points in their careers. During the Soviet period (1940-1941 and 1944-1989), it was known as the "Latvian SSR State Opera and Ballet Theatre".

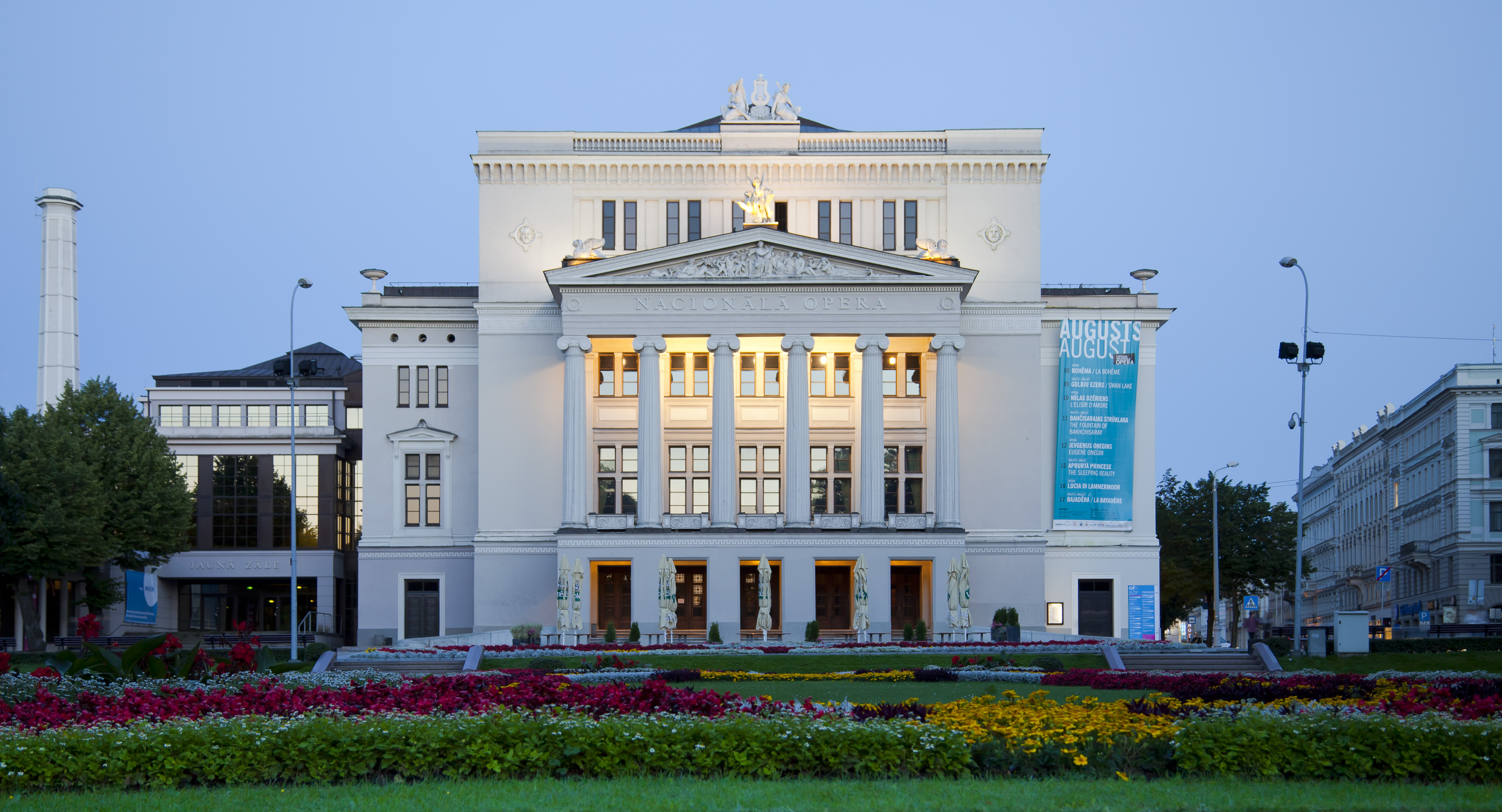
Latvian National Opera in the 21st century

The former Muse Society House at 4 Riharda Vāgnera Street has now been rebuilt, and the Latvian National Opera has been operating in the new building of the Riga City Theater in Riga since 1919.

== History ==
The origins of the Riga City Theatre date back to 1782, when the 500-seat Riga City Theatre House, designed by Haberland, was opened, its director Otto Hermann von Füttinghoff-Schöll maintained a large symphony orchestra of 24 musicians at his own expense, and when the Muses Society bought the building in 1815, the building became known as the Muses House. In 1837-1839, Richard Wagner was the theatre's Kapellmeister. In 1860-1863, a new theatre building was built in Riga with almost 2000 seats, which opened with productions of Friedrich Schiller's Wallenstein's Camp and Ludwig van Beethoven's Fidelio. Designed by the architect Ludwig Bonstet (1822-1885) as a Hellenised Classical building, the building was rebuilt in 1882-1887 to a design by the city architect Reinhold Schmeling after it burnt down in a fire. The theatre was closed down during the First World War and only reopened as the Deutsches Stadttheater after the German troops entered Riga in 1917.

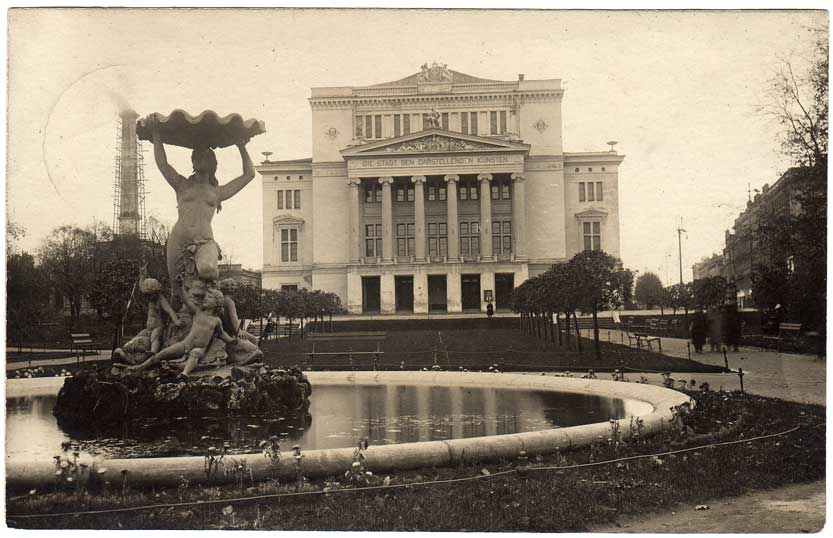
National Opera House in Riga, First Latvian Republic during World War I era

On 23 January 1919, by order of Andrejs Upītis, the head of the Art Department of the Education Commissariat of the LSPR, the Latvian Opera moved into the Riga City German Theatre building, and on 9 February the Latvian Opera was renamed the "Soviet Latvian Opera". From May to August 1919, the German theatre company was again active in the building of the 1st City Theatre in Riga, after which the Latvian Opera moved back in.On 23 September 1919, the Cabinet of Ministers of the Republic of Latvia adopted the "Regulations on the National Opera", and on 2 December the Latvian National Opera staged a performance of Richard Wagner's opera "Tannhäuser", which was celebrated as the day of the establishment of the Latvian National Opera.

After the occupation of Latvia, it was renamed the "State Opera and Ballet Theatre of the Latvian SSR", and during the German occupation of Latvia during World War II (1941-1944) the "Riga Opera Theatre", after which the former name was restored.

On 24 April 1989, the 70th anniversary of the Latvian National Opera was celebrated and the name was changed back to the name used during the interwar period.

== Theatre managers and artistic directors ==
It is known that the first theatre manager of Riga in 1782-1788 was Otto Hermann von Füttinghoff-Schöll. In 1837-1839 Richard Wagner was the theatre's Kapellmeister, in 1844-1855 and 1859-1862 Johann Schramek (Schramek, Šrámek), in 1863-1865 Johann Schramek was the theatre's Kapellmeister. 1863-1863, Ernst Catenhusen, 1865-1866, Eduard August Molnar, until 1893, Otto Lohse, 1898-1900, Bruno Walter.
