= Mežaparks Lutheran Church =

Church building in Riga, Latvia

Coordinates: 57.0024°N 24.1732°E

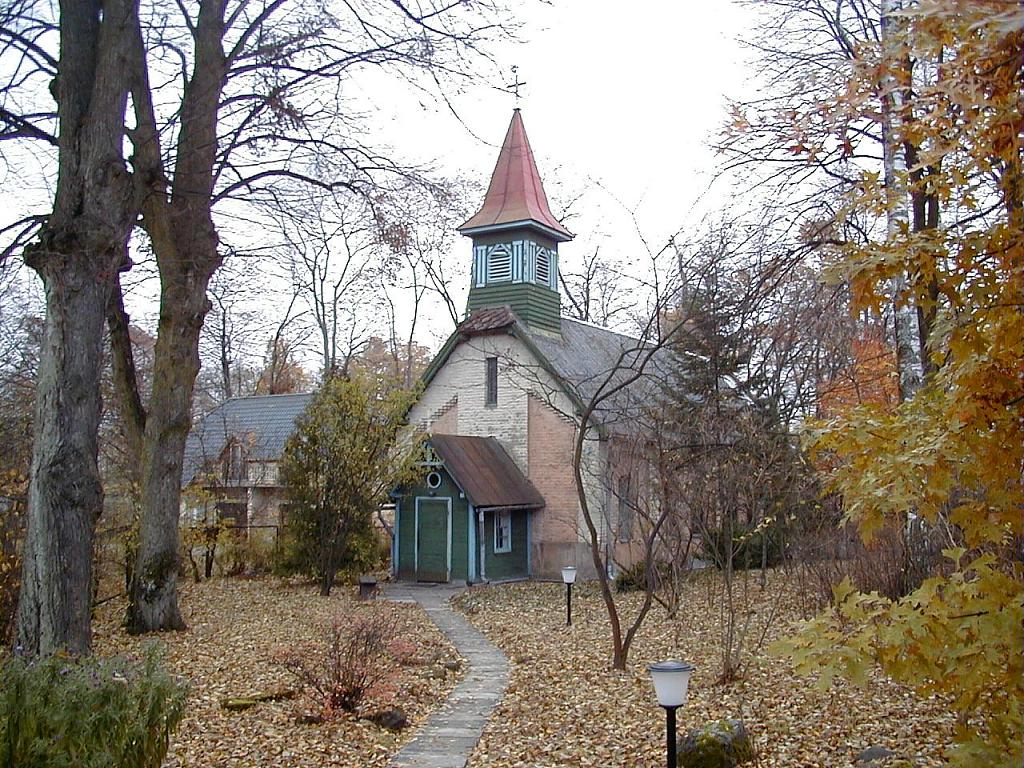
Mežaparks Lutheran Church

Mežaparks Lutheran Church (Latvian: Mežaparka evaņģēliski luteriskā baznīca) is a Lutheran church in Riga, the capital of Latvia. It is a parish church of the Evangelical Lutheran Church of Latvia. The church is situated at the address 1 Roberta Feldmaņa Street. Worship is offered in both Latvian and Russian languages.

== History ==
Mežaparks is a garden suburb project within Riga, artificially planned and created for deliberate expansion of the suburban district of the city. The project commenced in 1901. It is home to many new housing projects, an extensive public park, and the Riga city zoo. It may be reached by tram 11 and other public transport links. Local congregations of Christians arose in the area, but no church building was provided until 1927 when the old power station was converted into a Lutheran church and consecrated. Mežaparks Lutheran Church still meets in the converted power station; the small church seats fewer than 100 people (it is Riga's smallest Lutheran church), but by holding services both morning and evening on a Sunday, and during the week, everyone is accommodated.
