= St. Mary Magdalene's Church, Riga =

St. Mary Magdalene's Church
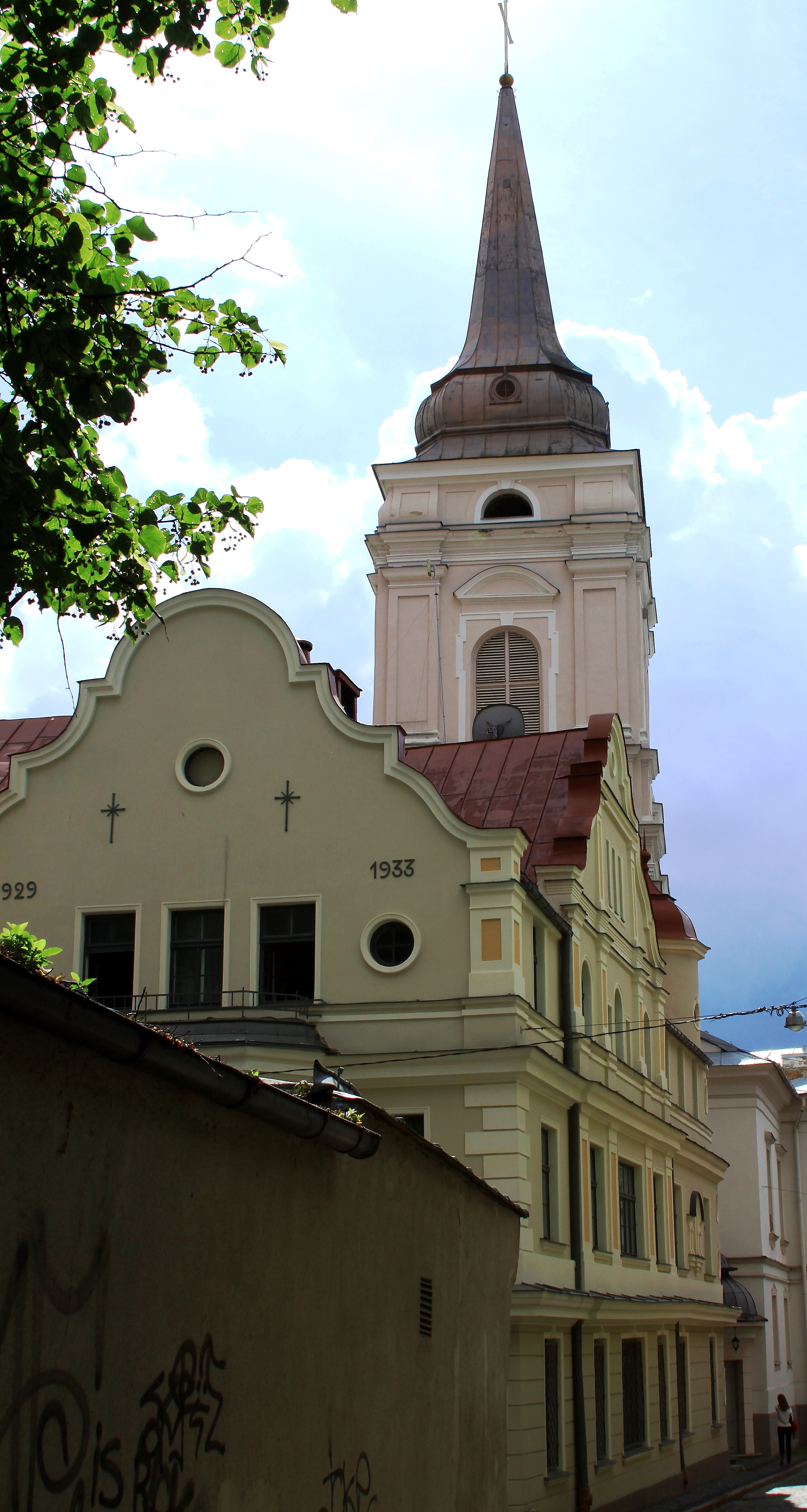

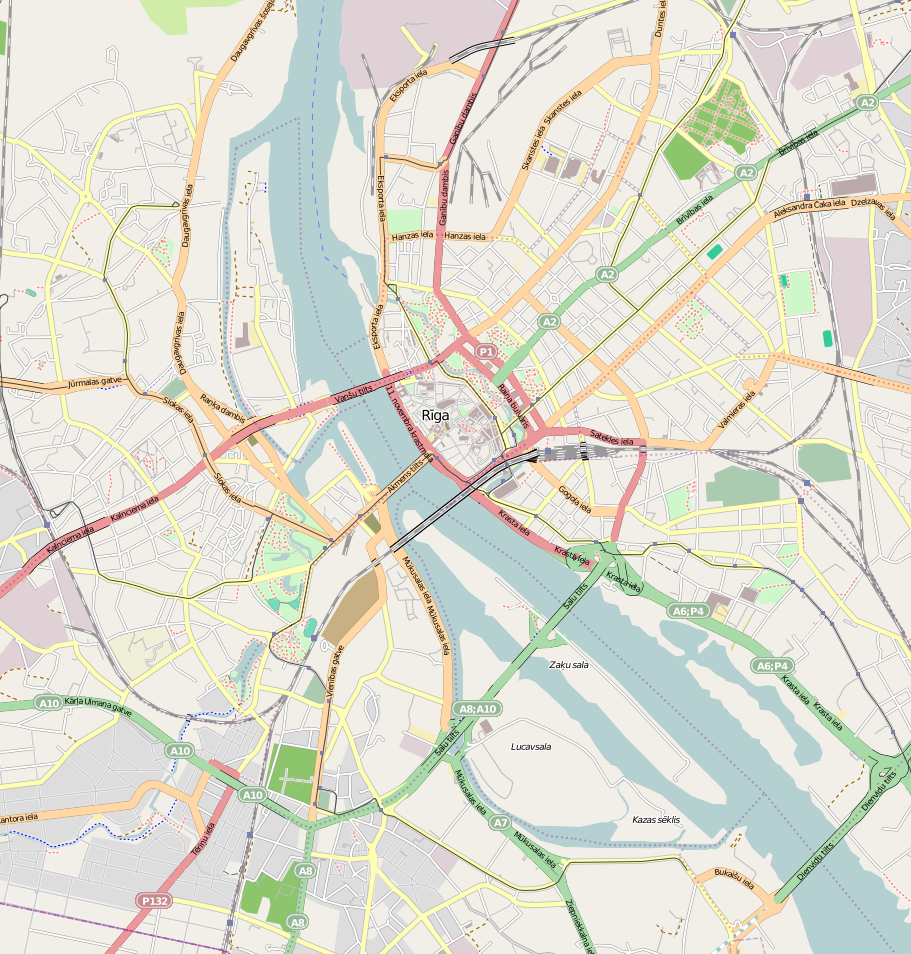
- Location within Riga
- 56°57′2.85″N 24°6′11.79″E
- Location: Riga
- Country: Latvia
- Denomination: Roman Catholic

St. Mary Magdalene's Church (Latvian: Svētās Marijas Magdalēnas Romas katoļu baznīca un klosteris) is a Roman Catholic church in Riga, the capital of Latvia. The church is situated at the address 2 Klostera iela.

The church is named for Jesus' companion, Mary Magdalene.
