= Dannenstern House =

Building in Riga, Latvia

Coordinates: 56°56′44″N 24°06′29″E

Dannenstern House Dannenšterna nams (in Latvian)
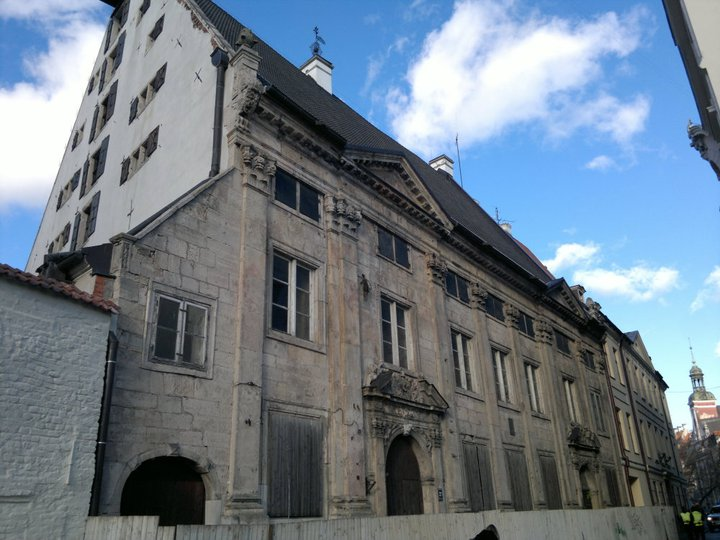
- Interactive map of the Dannenstern House; Dannenšterna nams (in Latvian) area

General information
- Architectural style: Baroque
- Location: Riga, Latvia
- Completed: 1696
- Client: Ernst Metsue von Dannenstern

Design and construction
- Architect: Rupert Bindenschu

The Dannenstern House (Latvian: Dannenšterna nams) is a historical building in the Old town of Riga, Latvia.

The house was built by and is named after Ernst Metsue von Dannenstern, a wealthy merchant. It dates from 1696 and is considered one of the finest examples of Baroque architecture in Riga. It was designed by German architect and chief architect of Riga Rupert Bindenschu. The street facade, in limestone, has giant order Corinthian pilasters and two elaborate entrance portals, created by sculptor D. Walter. The building also contains fragments of an earlier, medieval building.
