= Central District, Riga =

District of Riga, Latvia

Coordinates: 56.9511°N 24.1183°E

Central District Centra rajons
- Administrative district of Riga
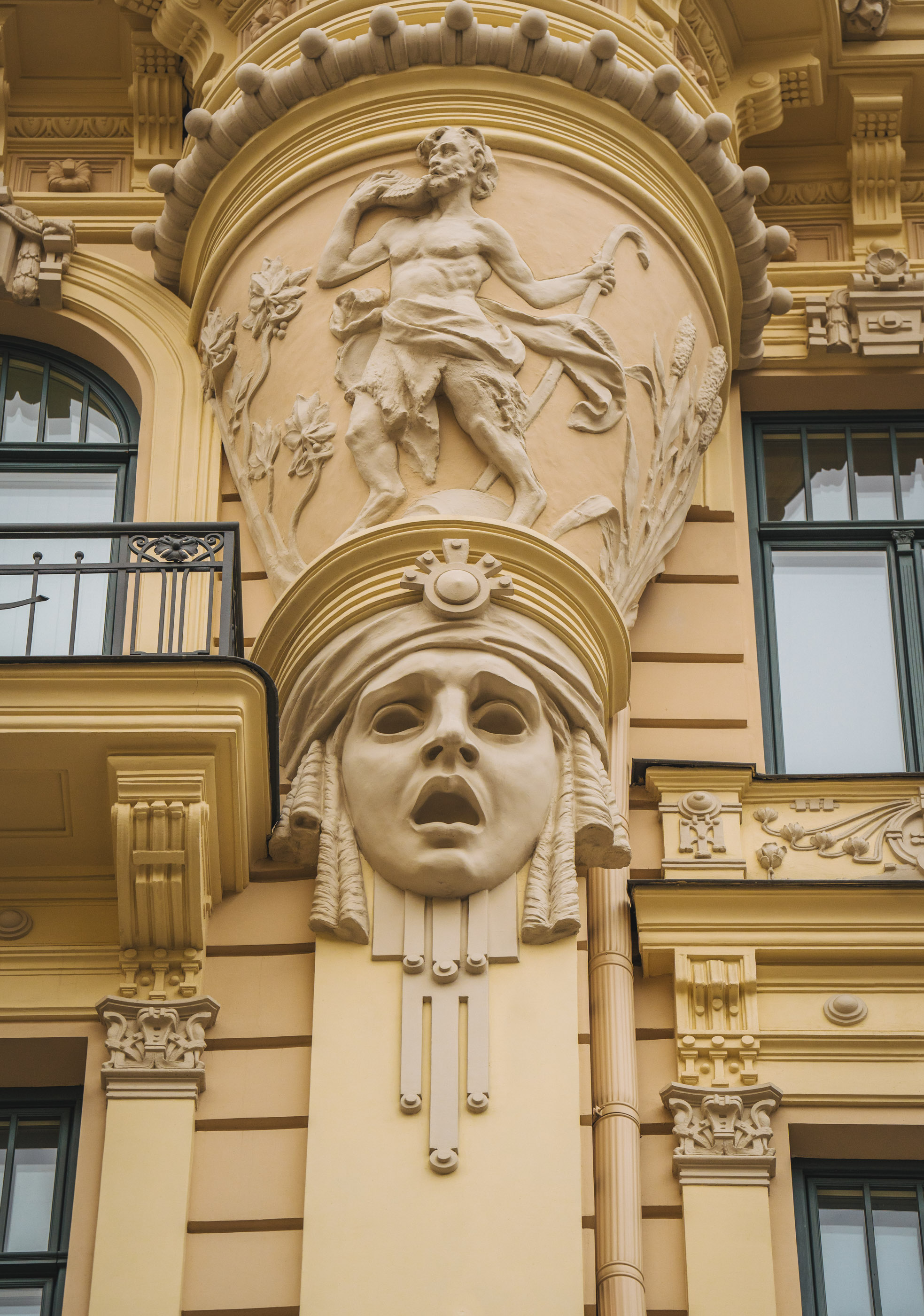
- The Central District of Riga is known for its Art Nouveau Architecture

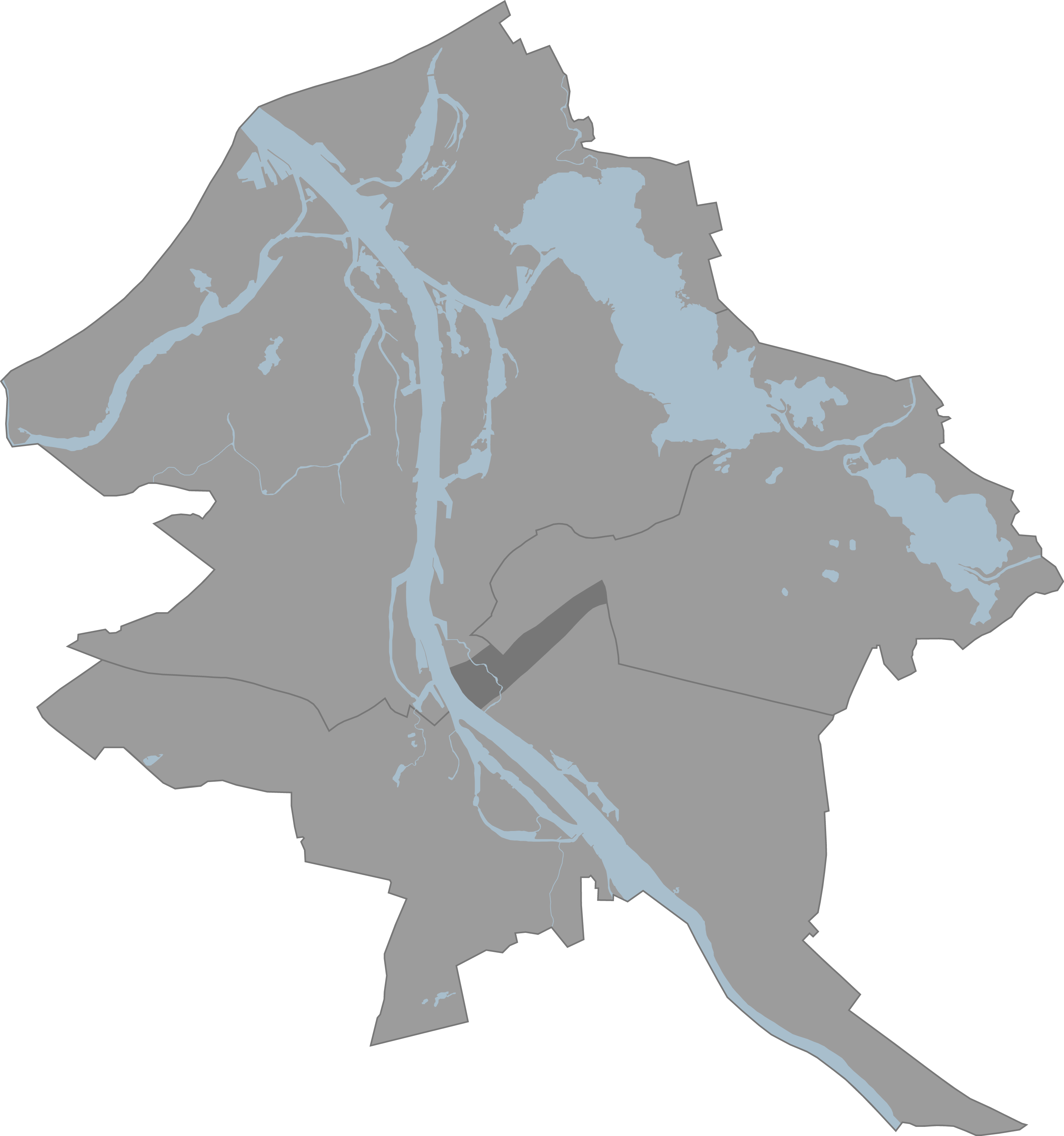
- Location in Riga
- Country: Latvia
- City: Riga

Area
  - Total: 3 km^{2} (1.2 sq mi)

Population (2018)
  - Total: 25,128
  - Density: 8,400/km^{2} (22,000/sq mi)

Central District (Latvian: Centra rajons) is one of the six administrative districts of Riga, the capital of Latvia. With an area of 3 km^{2} and a population of 25,128 inhabitants, it is the smallest and least populated district of the city. The district covers most of central Riga and is made up of the neighbourhoods of Vecrīga (Old Riga) and Centrs (the outer center of the city).

== History ==
The district, as most others, started to take shape in the late 19th century. After the Latvian War of Independence the term 'Center of Riga' (Rīgas centrs) was used. After the Soviet occupation of Latvia, the Kirov District (Kirova rajons), named after Sergei Kirov, was created in January 1941 by combining Centrs and a part of Vidzeme Suburb. The city was divided into six defined districts to facilitate Soviet police surveillance and management of nationalized properties.

In October 1947, an eastern section of the Kirov District was split off to form Molotov District (Molotova rajons, named after Vyacheslav Molotov), but in 1956 the Molotov District was split up between Kirov, Proletarian and Moscow districts. An area of Moscow District was transferred to the Kirov District in 1962.

After the restoration of the independence of Latvia, the district was renamed as Central District in 1991.
