= Swedish Gate, Riga =

Gate in Riga, Latvia

Coordinates: 56.9514401°N 24.106375°E

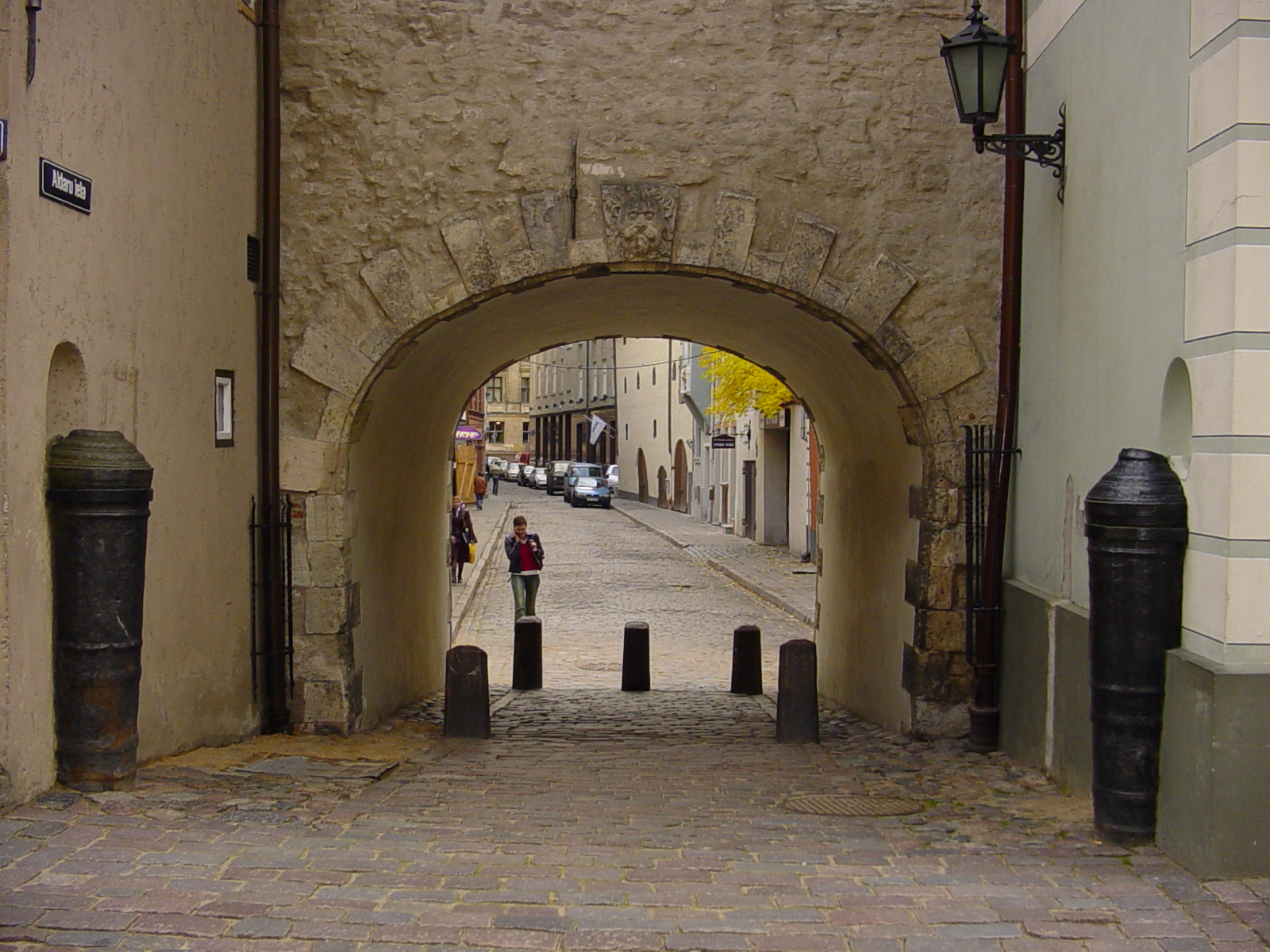
View of the Swedish Gate

The Swedish Gate (Latvian: Zviedru vārti) is situated in Riga, Latvia, and was erected 1698 as a part of the Riga Wall to provide access to barracks outside the city wall. These gates are the only remaining gates from the former eight. They are located on Torņa street 11 (Torņa iela 11).

== Legends ==
=== Rendezvous ===
One of the legends about this structure tells about the origins of the name of the gates, which goes as following: it has been told that young ladies were forbidden to date soldiers, but one romantic relationship between a girl and a Swedish soldier did develop. And so that happened that these gates were their meeting spot. Once, the young man did not arrive at the usual place, and the locals, knowing that the girl has been involved in this prohibited affinity, took her and built her into the wall of the gates. Since then, the rumor goes that in the midnight her cries can be heard by those whose love is pure and unconditional: "I still do love him..!"

== In popular culture ==
Kurt Wallander visits the site in the novel Dogs of Riga.
