= Vidzeme Suburb, Riga =

Administrative division of Riga, Latvia

Coordinates: 56.9667°N 24.2167°E

Vidzeme District (Latvian: Vidzemes priekšpilsēta) is one of six administrative districts of Riga, the capital of Latvia. It is within the Eastern European Time Zone (GMT+2). The Vidzeme Market is one of Riga's oldest markets.
