= Latgale neighbourhood =

Neighbourhood of Riga, Latvia

Coordinates: 56°56′04″N 24°08′43″E

Latgale neighborhood
- Neighborhood of Riga
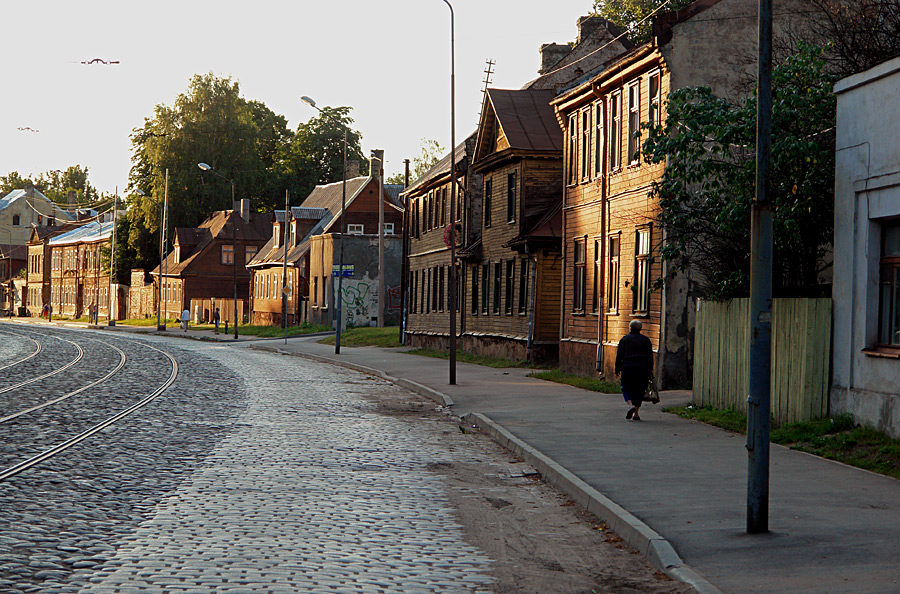
- Latgales Street, the main thoroughfare

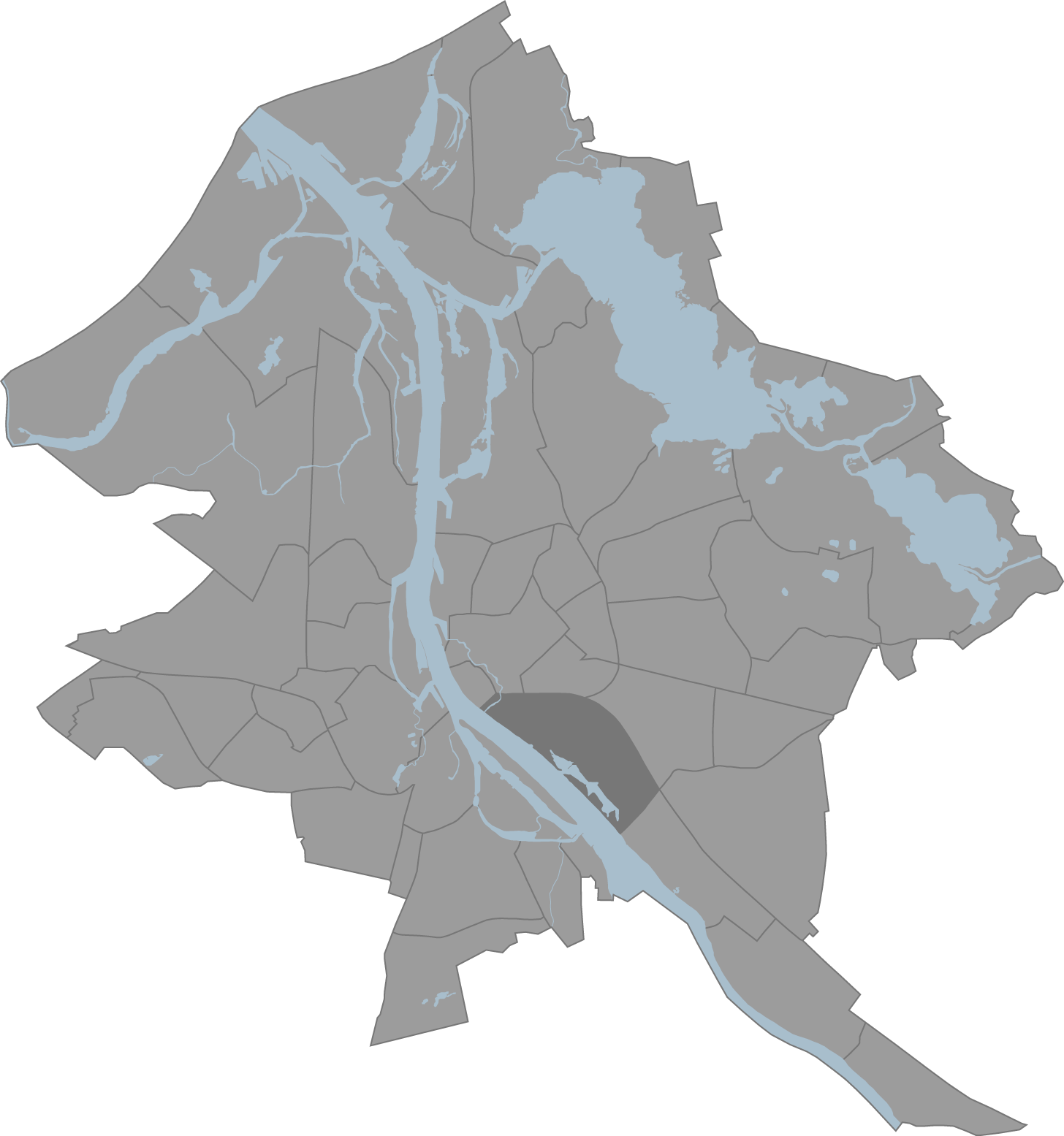
- Location in Riga
- Country: Latvia
- City: Riga
- District: Latgale Suburb

Area
  - Total: 7,594 km^{2} (2,932 sq mi)

Population (2024)
  - Total: 23,256
  - Density: 3.062/km^{2} (7.932/sq mi)
- Time zone: UTC+2 (EET)
  - Summer (DST): UTC+3 (EEST)
- Postal codes: LV-1003, LV-1019, LV-1053
- Website: apkaimes.lv

The Latgale neighbourhood of Riga is situated on the right bank of the Daugava River, located to the south of Old Riga. Until 2024, the neighbourhood was named Maskavas forštate (German: Moskauer Vorstadt), and was also known as Maskavas priekšpilsēta and colloquially as Maskačka—a name derived from the road historically connecting Riga to Moscow.

== History ==
The history of Maskavas forštate, whose name in English literally means Moscow Suburb, goes back to at least the 14th century, in some parts the medieval street network has been preserved. However, the area is first mentioned in 1348 by the name of Lastādija (German: Lastadie).

Architecturally, the neighborhood reflects its history as an area of Russian, Belarusian and Jewish migration, especially characteristic wooden homes.

During the Nazi occupation of Riga, the neighborhood was turned into a ghetto for Jews. Today, there are memorials on the site of the Great Choral Synagogue and the Old Jewish Cemetery. Most of the prewar buildings remain standing.

Prior to World War II, the area was referred to in official Latvian documents as the Statistical District Latgale and informally as Latgales apkaime (Latgale neighborhood) before becoming known as Maskavas forštate (Moscow Suburb). After independence from the Soviet Union, it reverted to its prewar name in 2024 as part of derussification efforts by the Latvian government.

== Demographics ==
In the 1980s and 1990s the area developed a reputation for drug abuse and criminal activity. New buildings, offices, shops and the migration of local families have changed the district's economic profile in the 21st century.

By 2008, Maskavas Forštate had an average level of criminality along with the Centre and Old Riga. The Ministry of the Interior of Latvia divided Riga into 9 districts with the following levels of criminality:

- 2 - High (more than 2900 criminal offences): Located in the periphery of Riga.
- 4 - Average (between 2100 and 2700 criminal offences): Centre, Old Riga, Maskavas forštate.
- 3 - Low (less than 1700 criminal offences): Purvciems, Mežaparks (One of the wealthier areas of Riga).

Based on the number of criminal offences against foreigners, Maskavas forštate was the 3rd safest district in Riga according to the statistics.

== Architecture ==
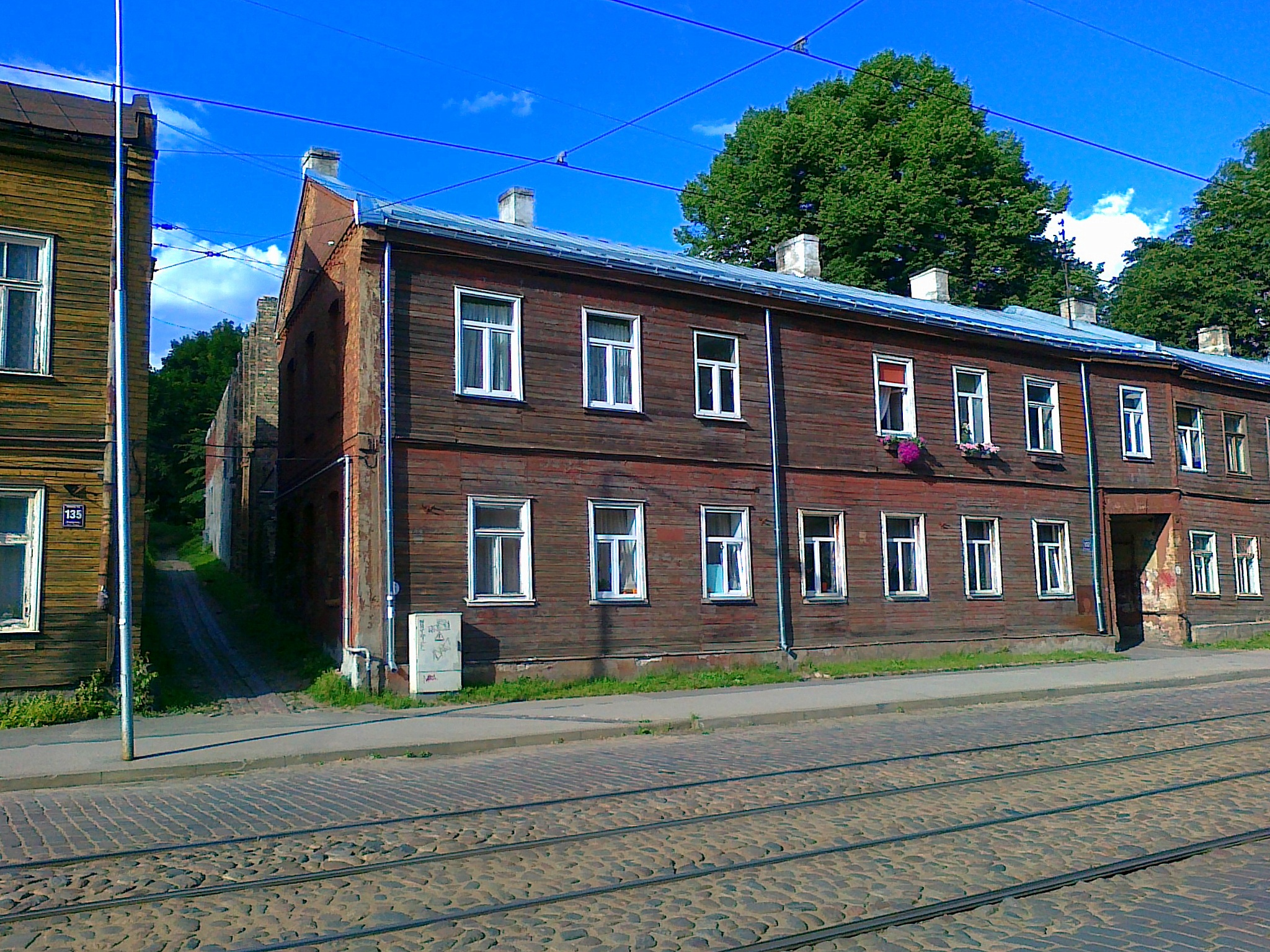
Wooden buildings

The area has a notable legacy of diverse religious buildings, reflecting its history as a destination for numerous migrants.

- The Lutheran Jesus Church is the biggest wooden classical building in Latvia.
- Grebenstchikov Old Believer House of Prayer is the largest in the world.

The Central Market is located next to the railway station in a series of former Zeppelin hangars.

Protected Heritage status for older wooden houses has prevented their demolition, and a process of gentrification is underway.

== Higher Education ==
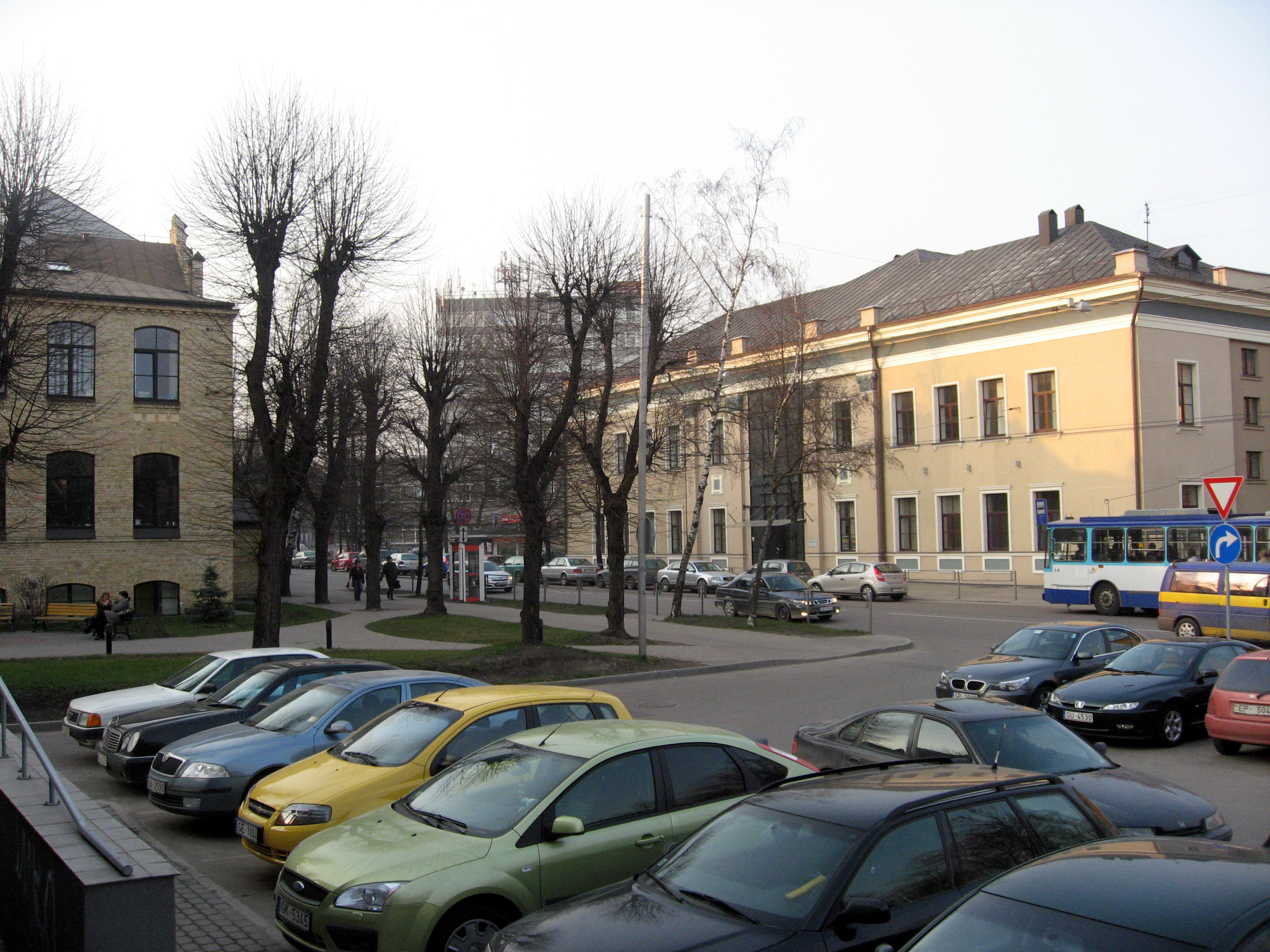
Baltic International Academy

Lomonosova Street (lv) is the location of a cluster of higher education institutions.

- Baltic International Academy
- Transport and Telecommunication Institute
- ISMA University
- College of Economics and Culture (lv)

The building of the Latvian Academy of Sciences is located on Akadēmijas Square. Nearby is the Riga Building College.

The Latvian Academy of Culture (lv) is on Ludzas Street (lv).

== Transport ==
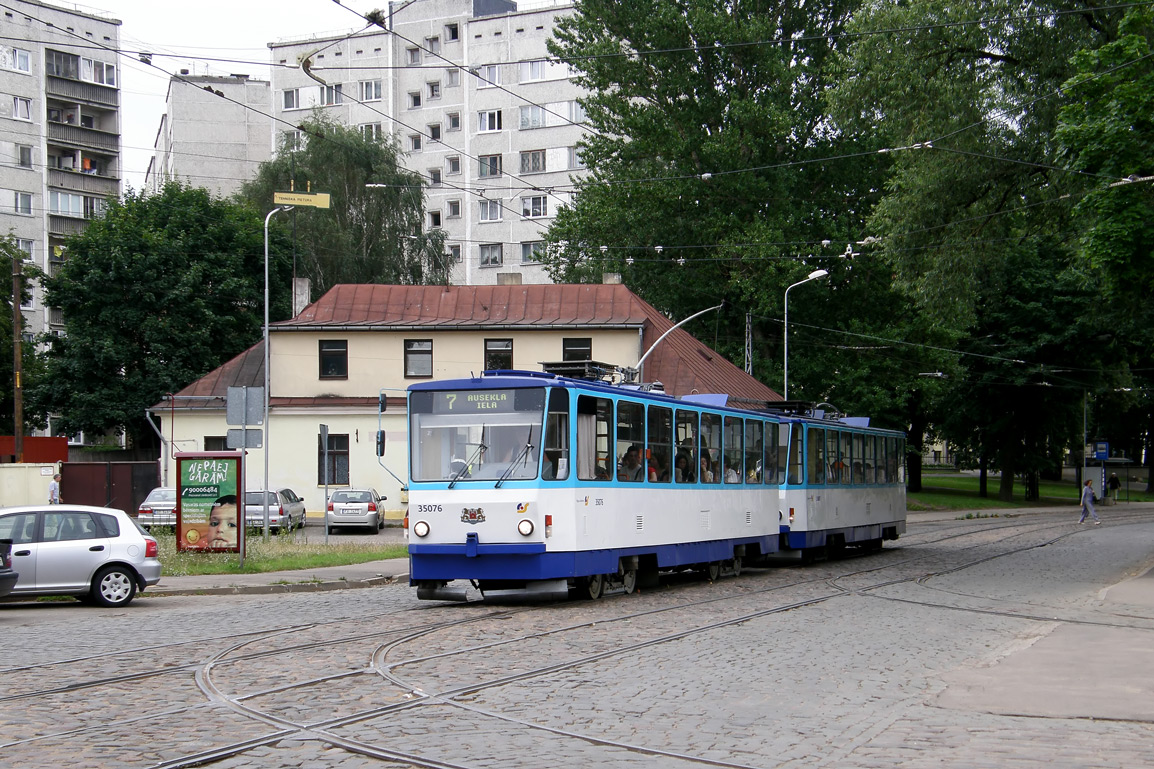
Tram on Latgales street

The suburb is defined by the Riga–Daugavpils Railway which borders it on the north and east along with marshaling yards. If the Rail Baltica project is competed as planned in Riga, part of the railway embankment separating the suburb from the city centre will be replaced by an overpass bridge, greatly restoring access to the suburb.

Central and Vagonu Parks stations are accessible from the area. Rigas Satiksme operates a tramline down Latgales street and bus services throughout.

== In popular culture ==
Some scenes in the television adaptation of the Robert Harris novel Archangel, starring Daniel Craig, were filmed on Latgales (formerly Maskavas) iela and Katoļu iela.

The 1995 adaption of The Dogs of Riga featured scenes set at Riga Central Market. In the 2012 adaptation, in the Wallander TV series featuring Kenneth Branagh, the main character visits Latgale Market (Latgales tirgus) on Firsa Sadovņikova street.

== Gallery ==
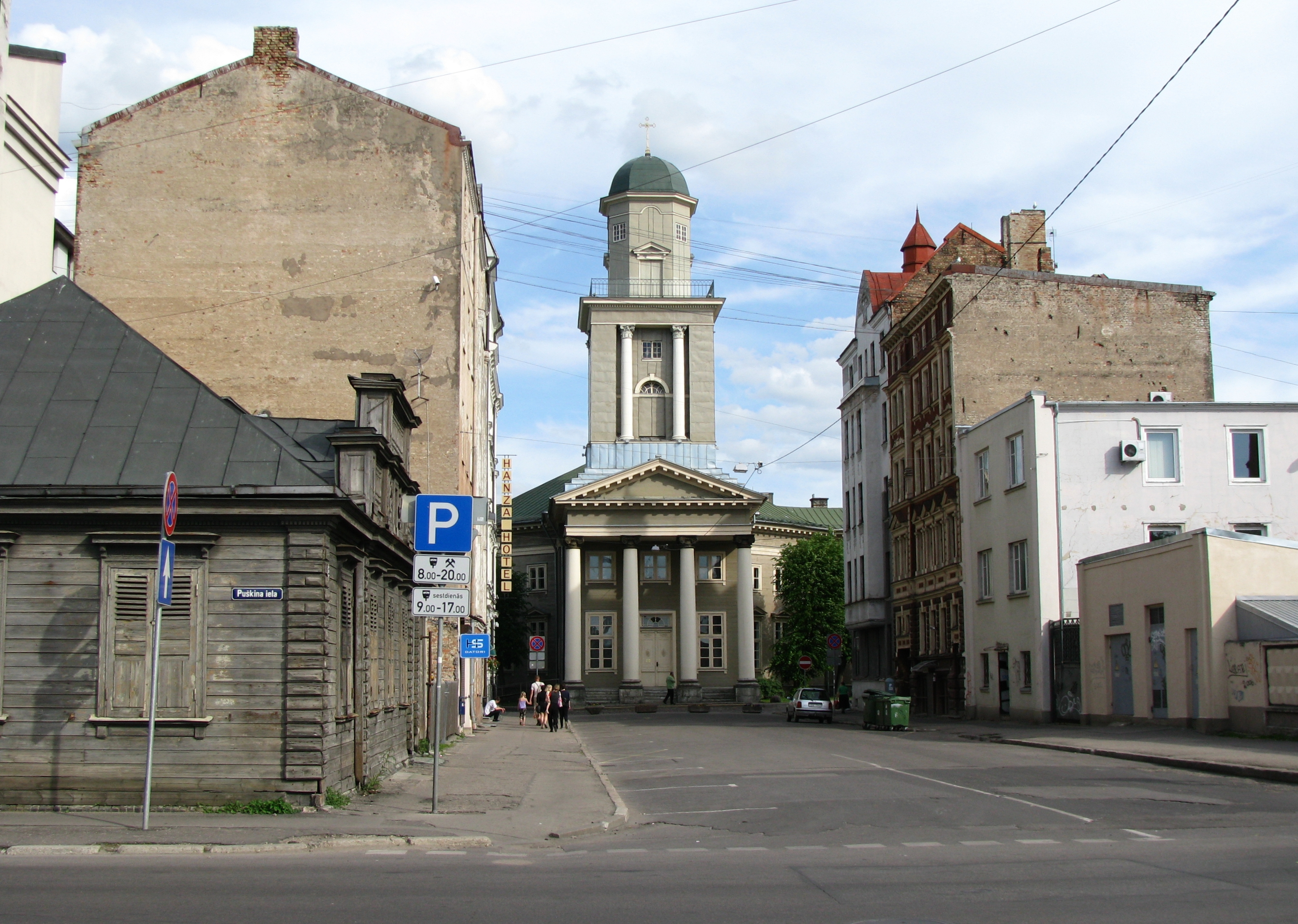
Lutheran Church of Jesus

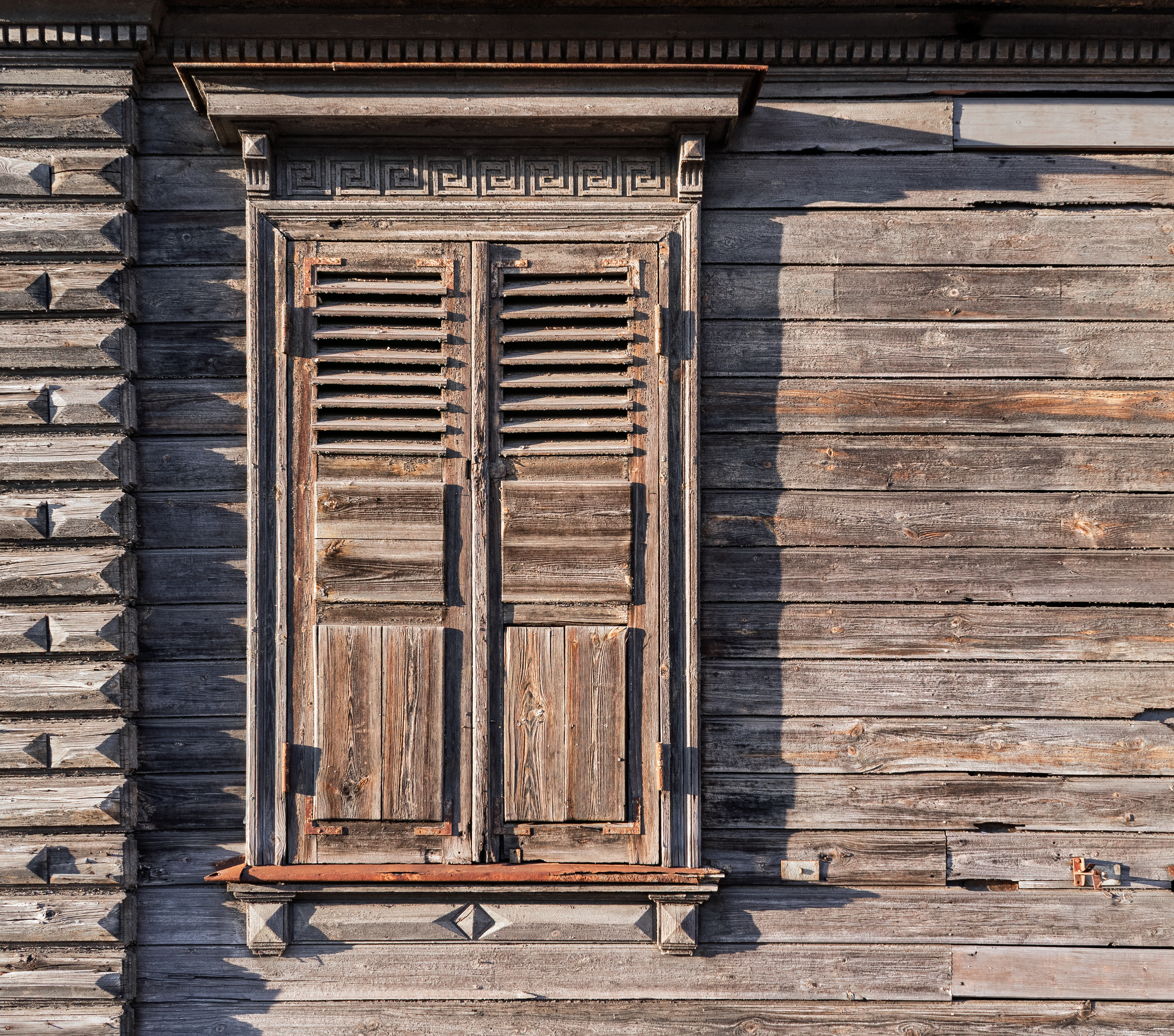
Architectural detail of 1 Elias Street (1813)

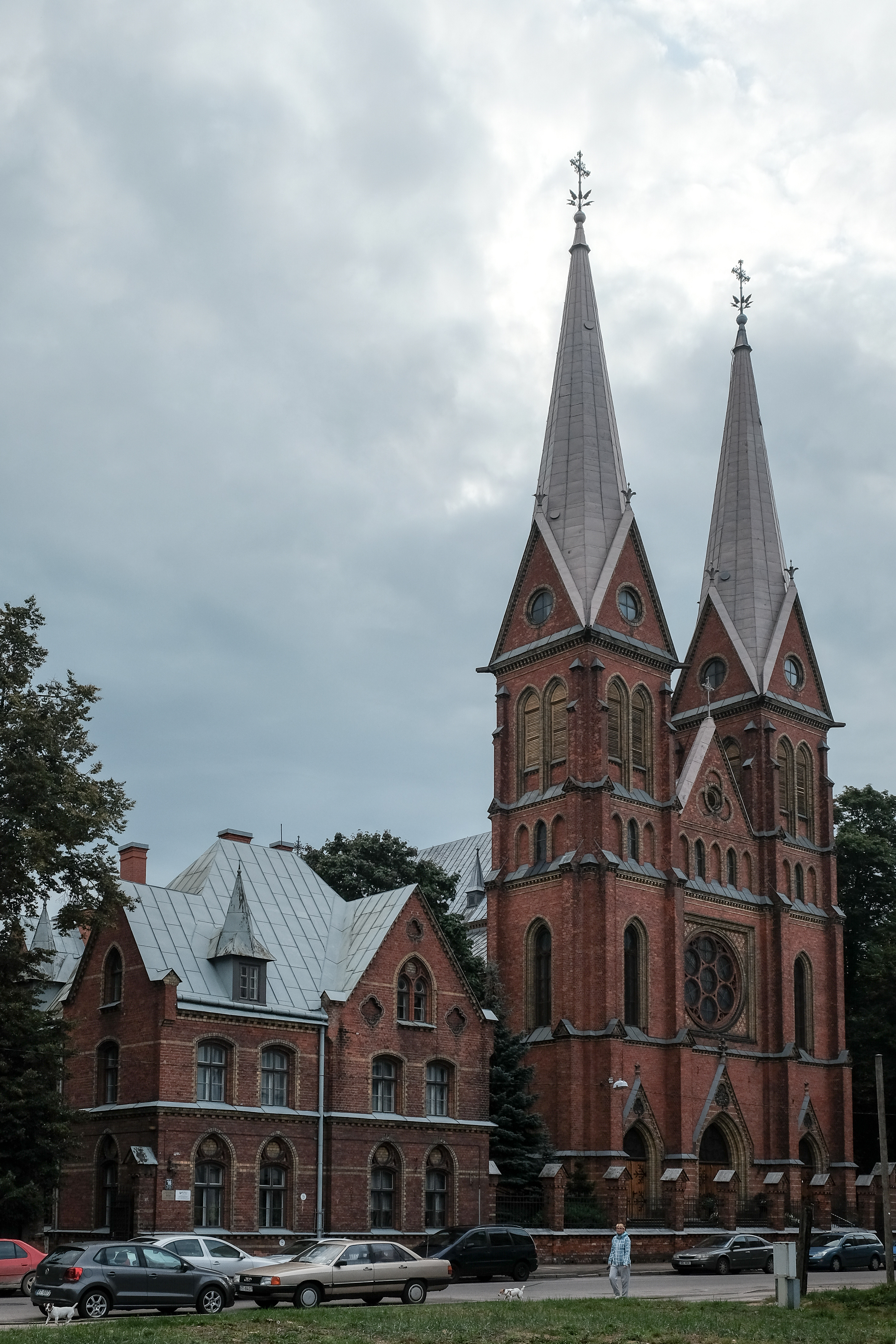
St. Francis Catholic Church and school

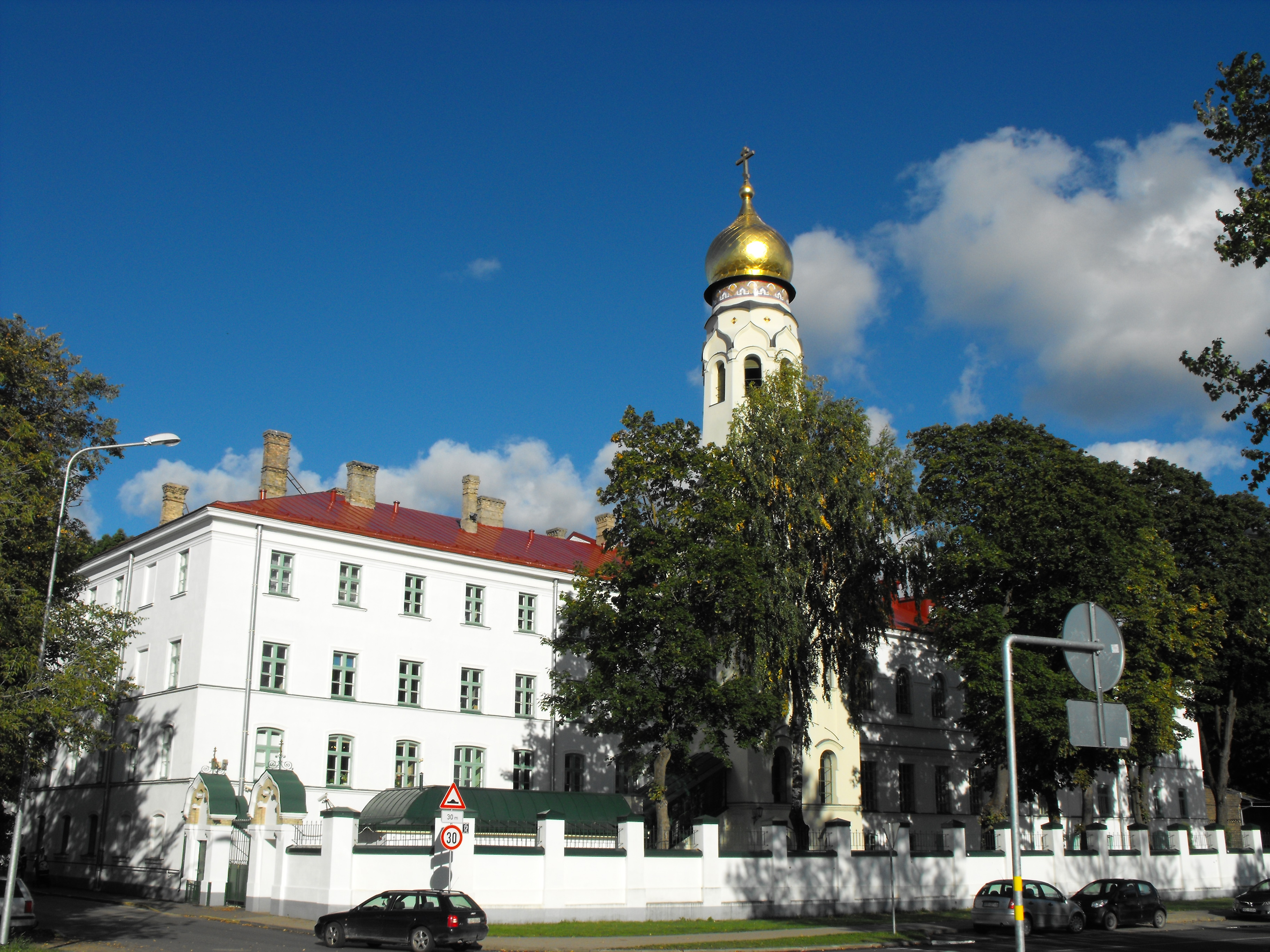
Old Believer's House of Prayer

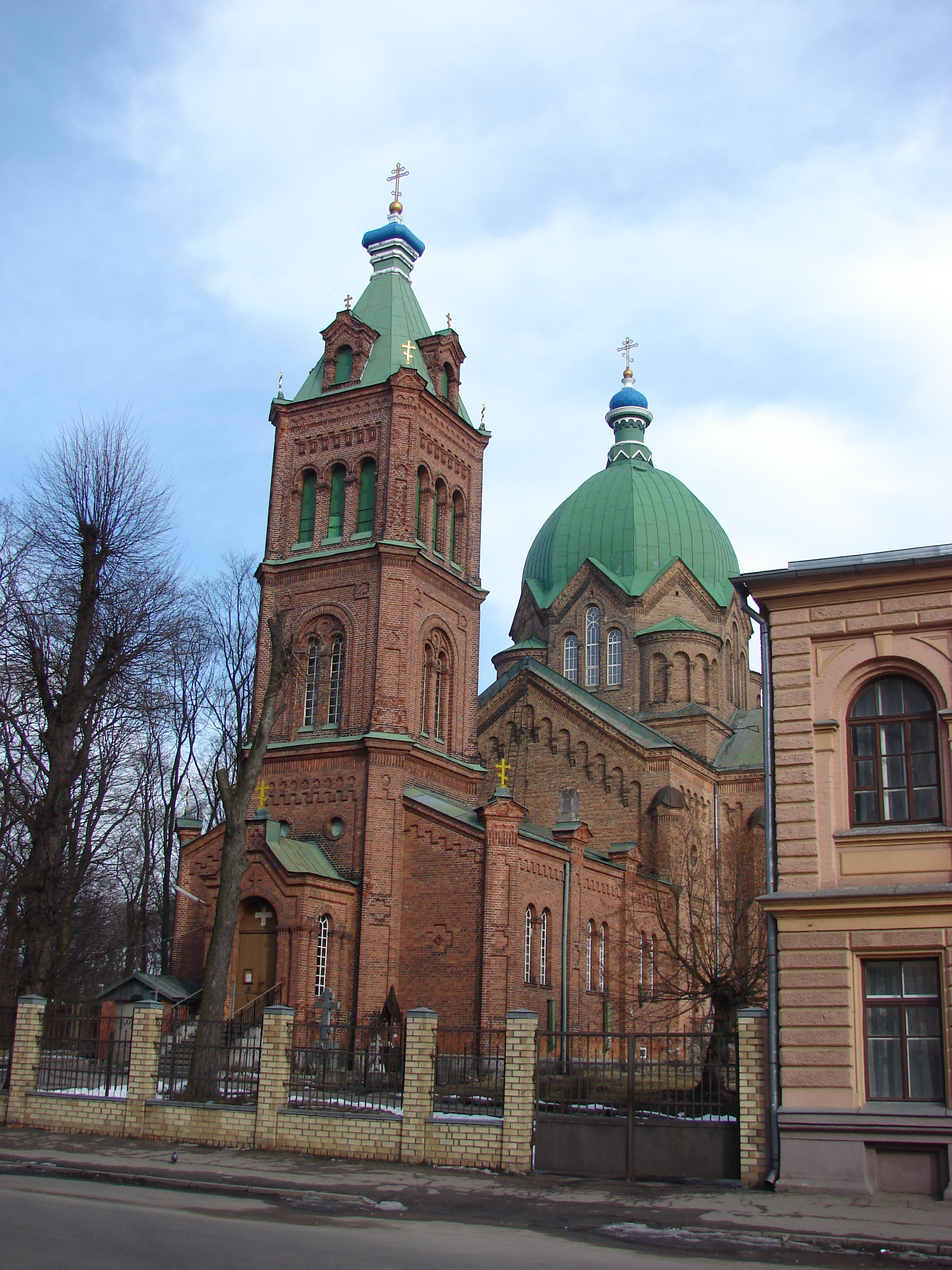
All Saints Orthodox Church

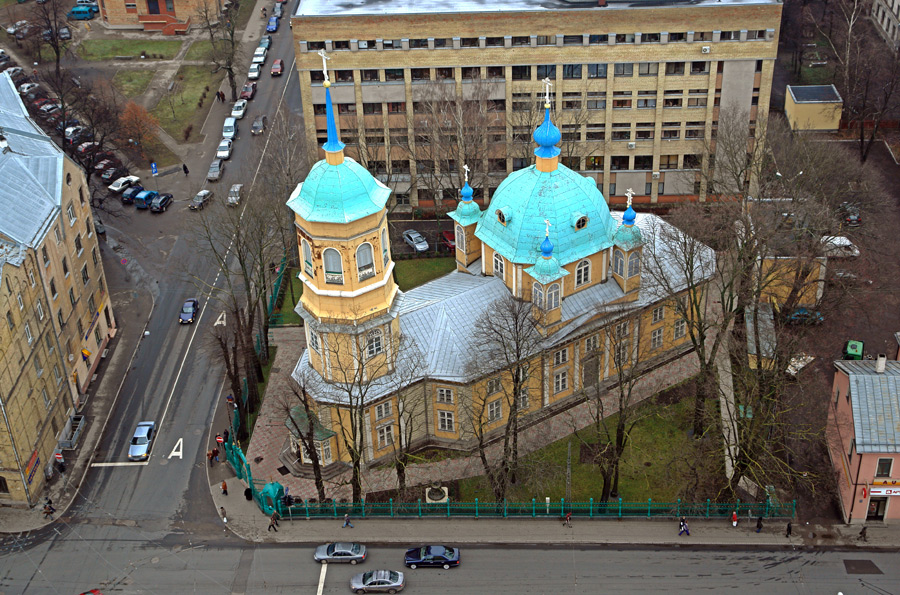
Orthodox Church of the Annunciation from the spire of the Academy of Sciences

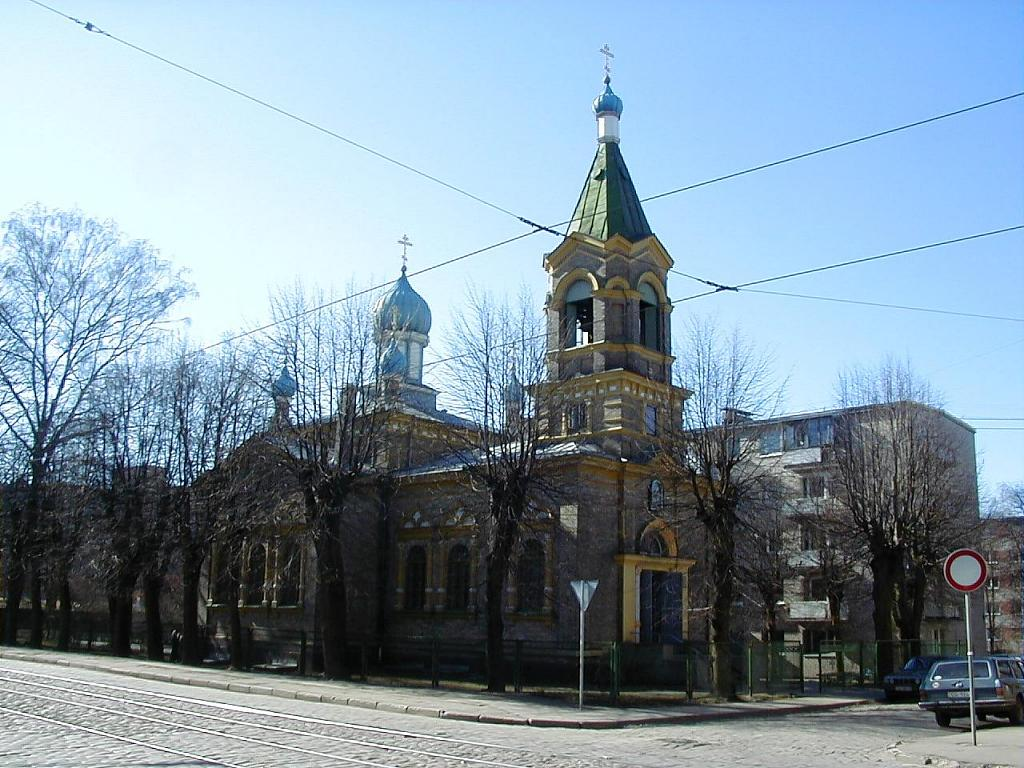
Holy Archangel Mikhail Orthodox Church

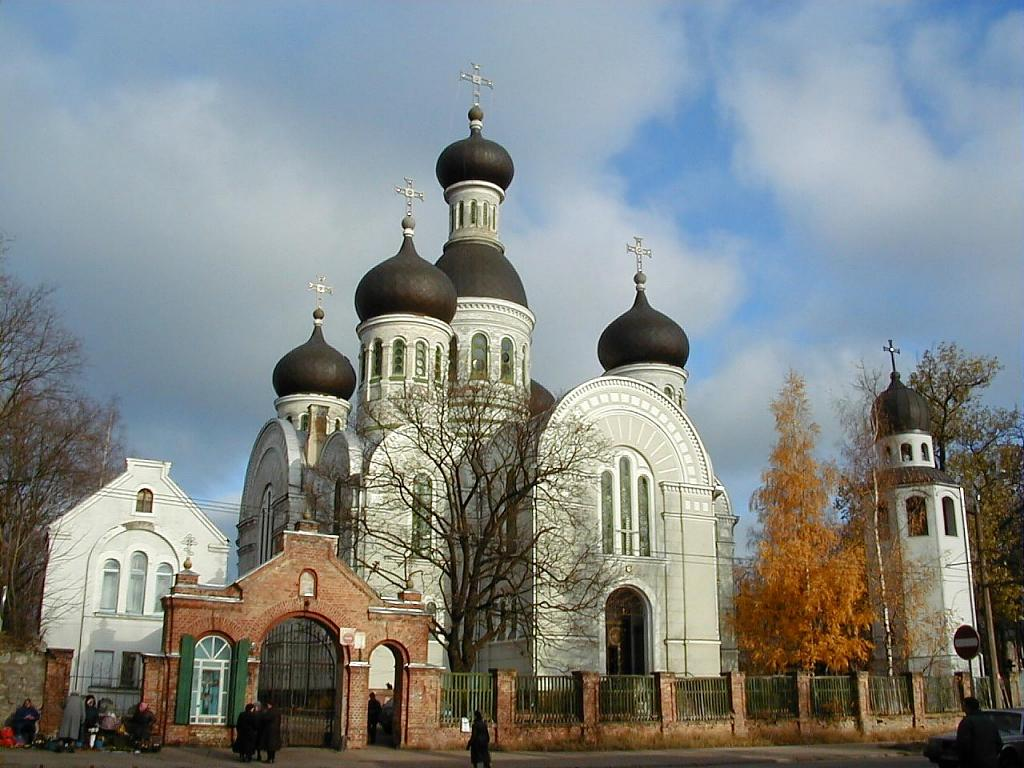
St. John the Forerunner Orthodox Church

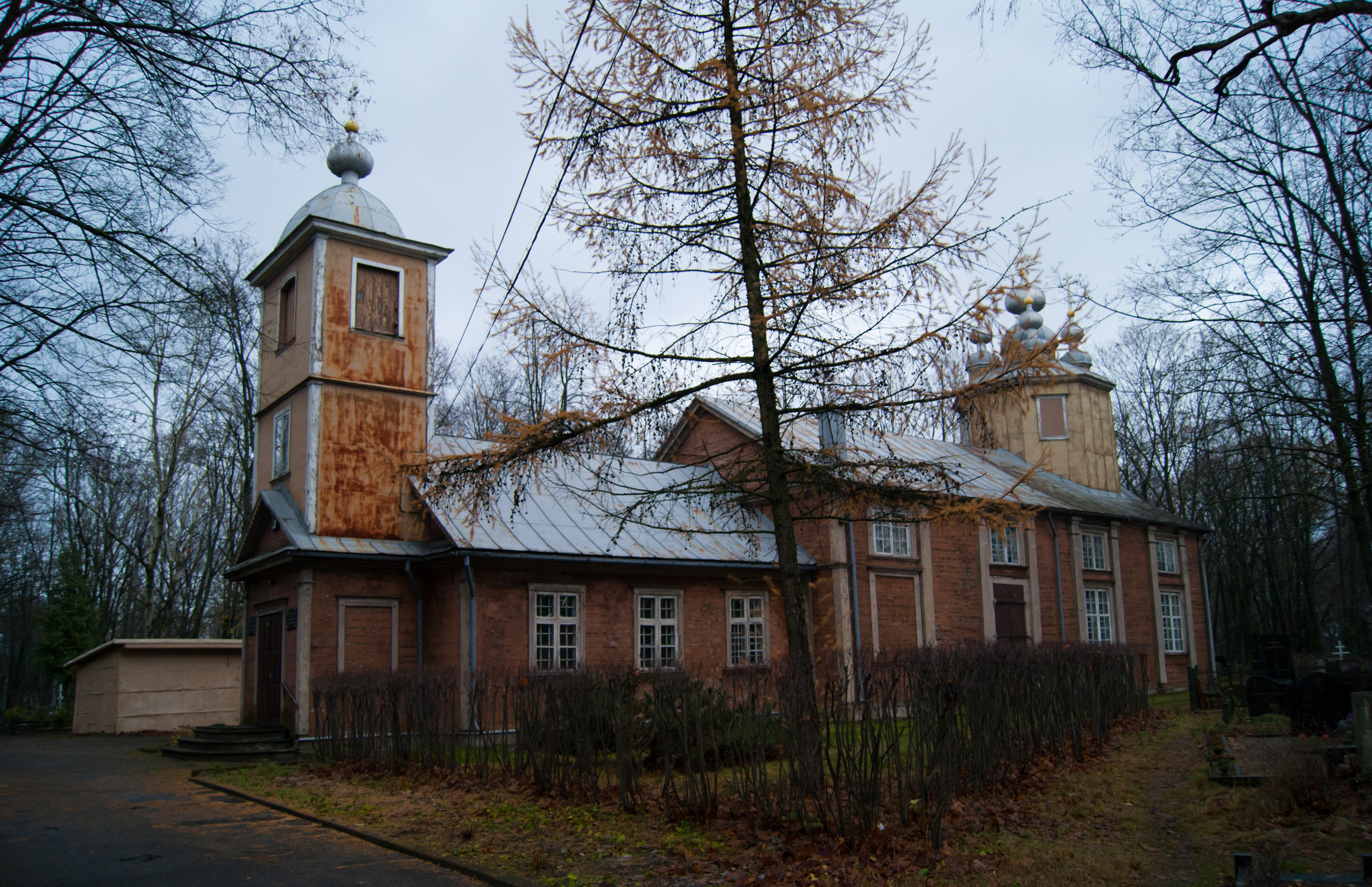
Orthodox Church of Our Lady of Kazan

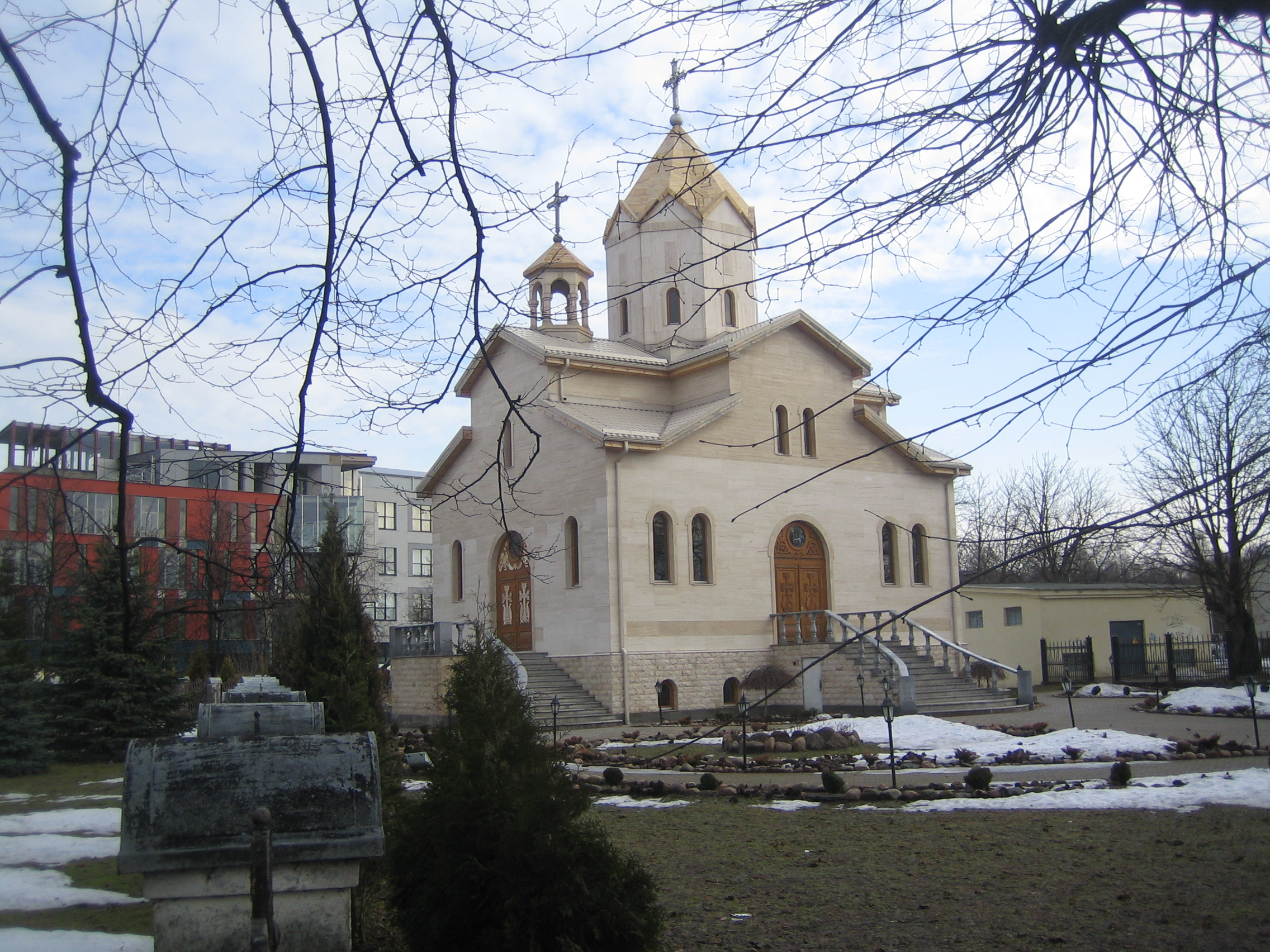
St. Gregory Armenian Apostolic Church

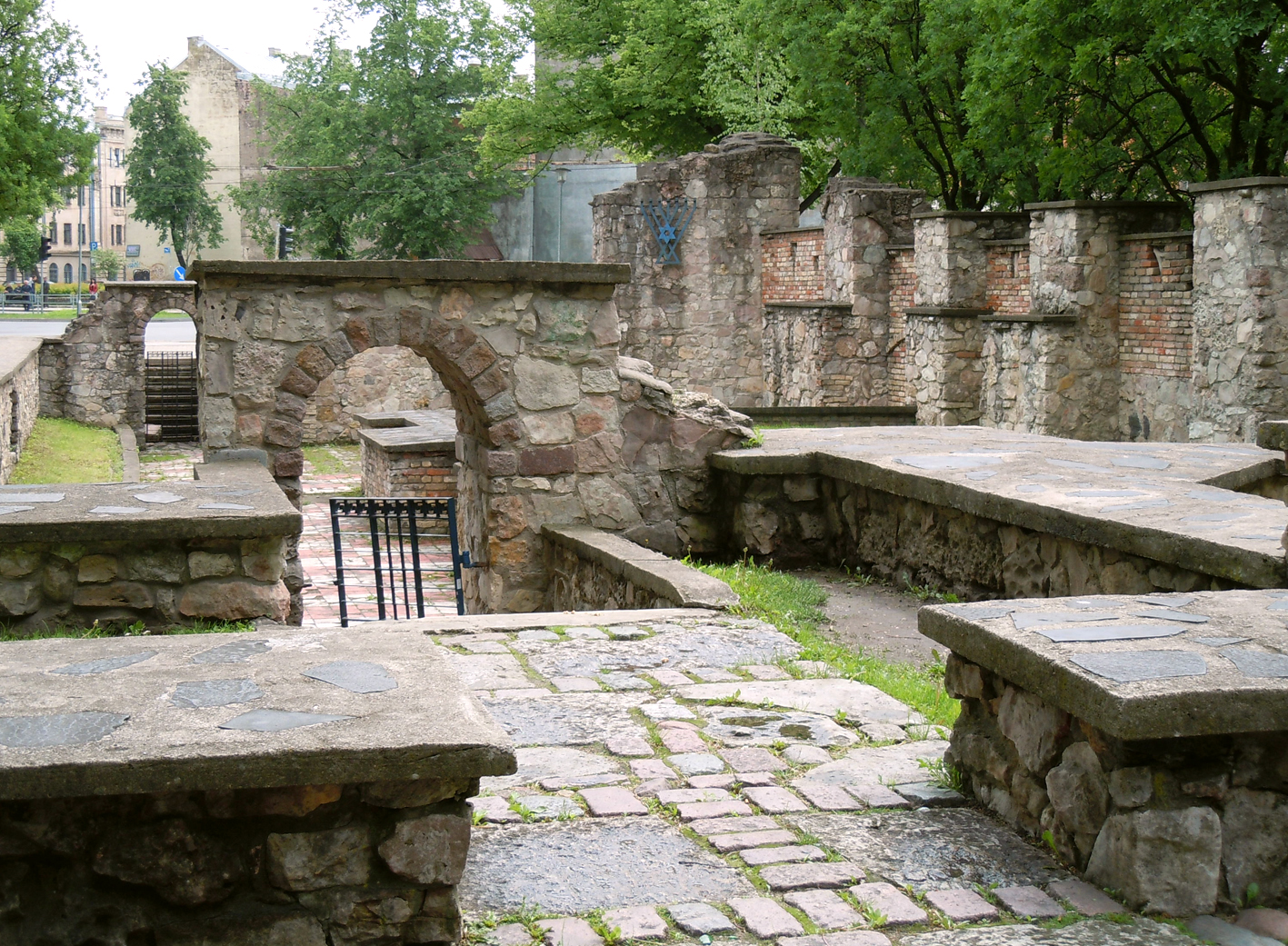
Ruins of the Great Choral Synagogue

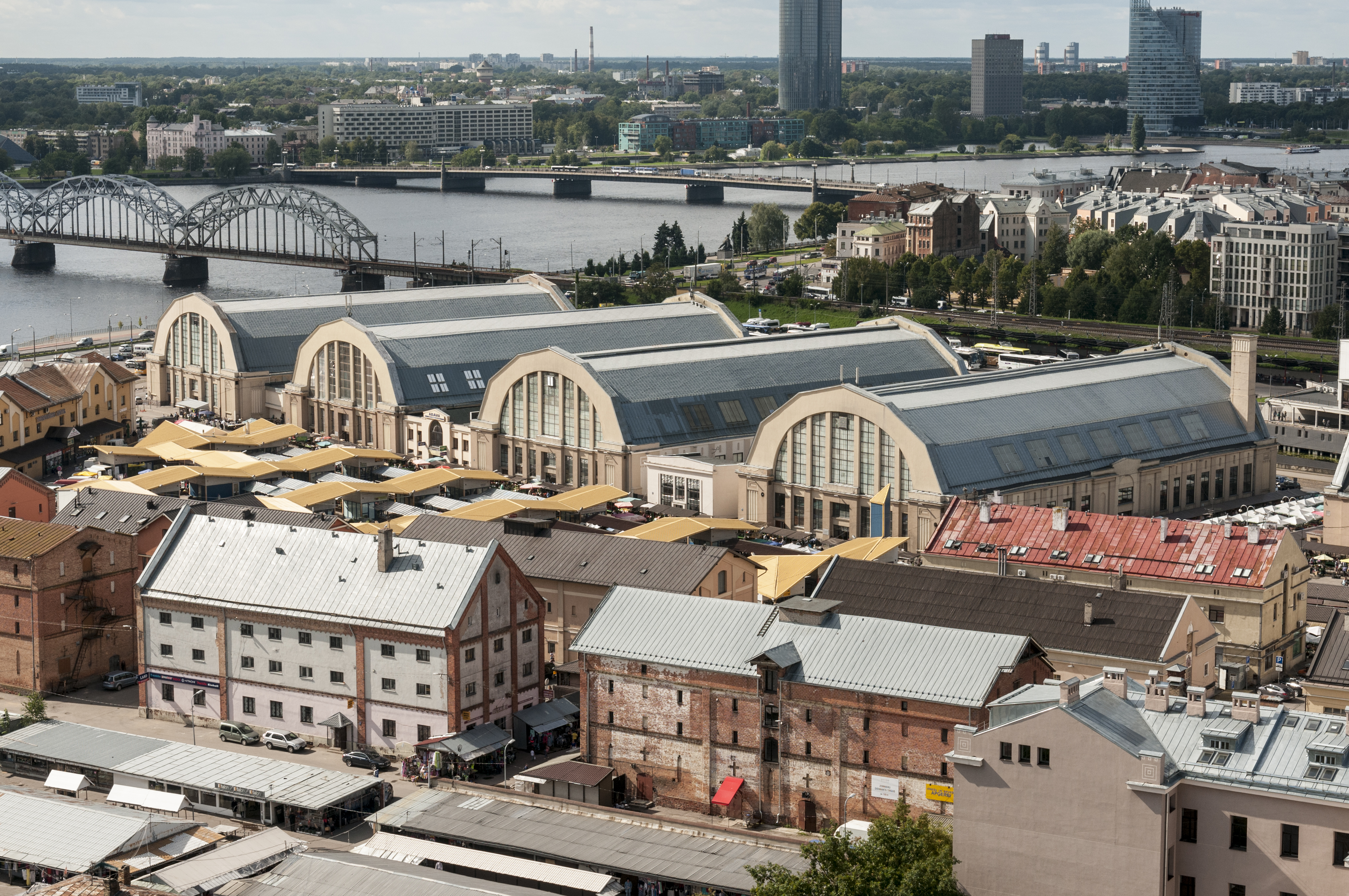
Central Market and railway tracks

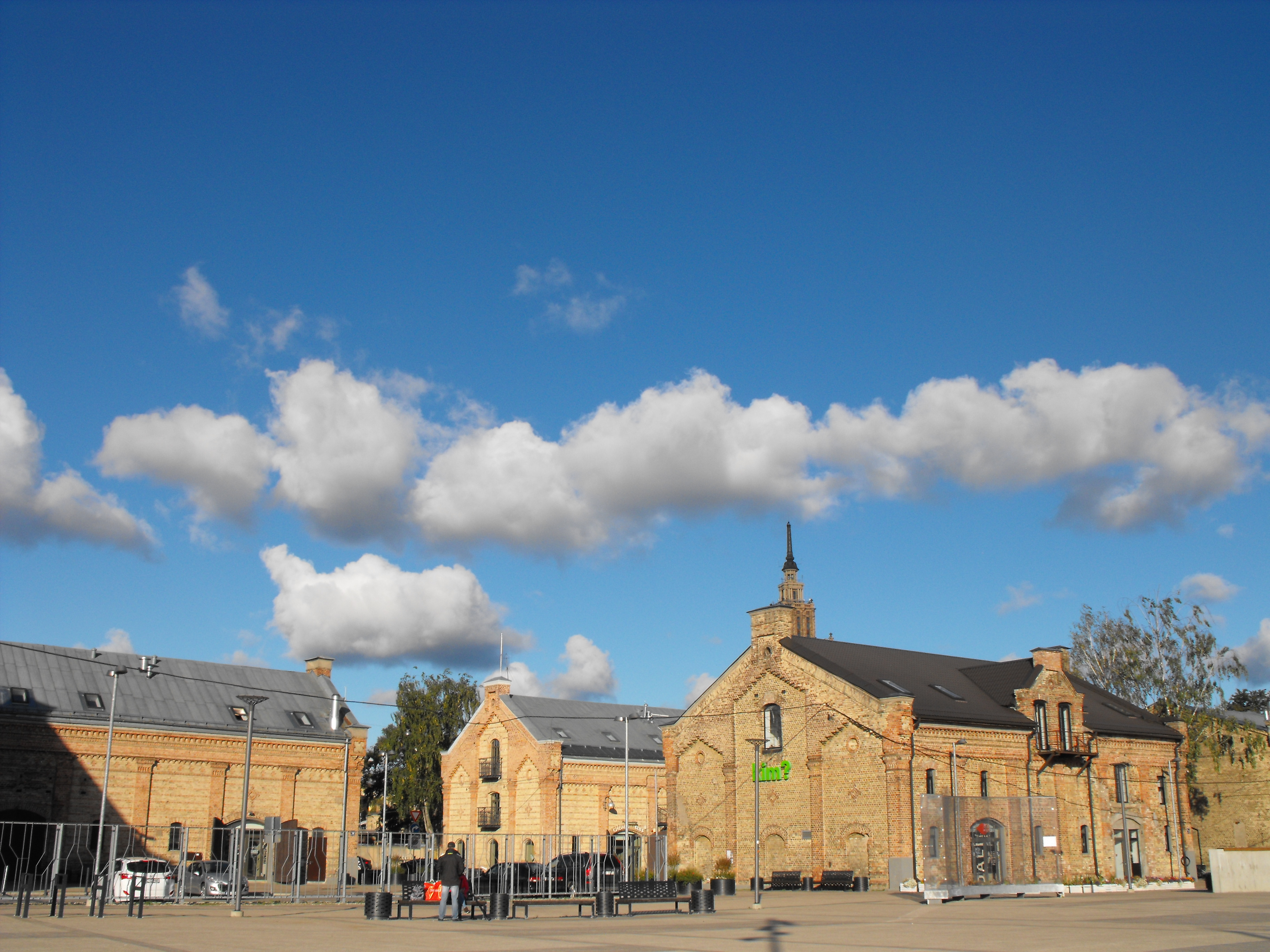
Quarter of Sarkanie Spīķeri old warehouses now reconstructed as offices and exhibition halls (Latgales 24).

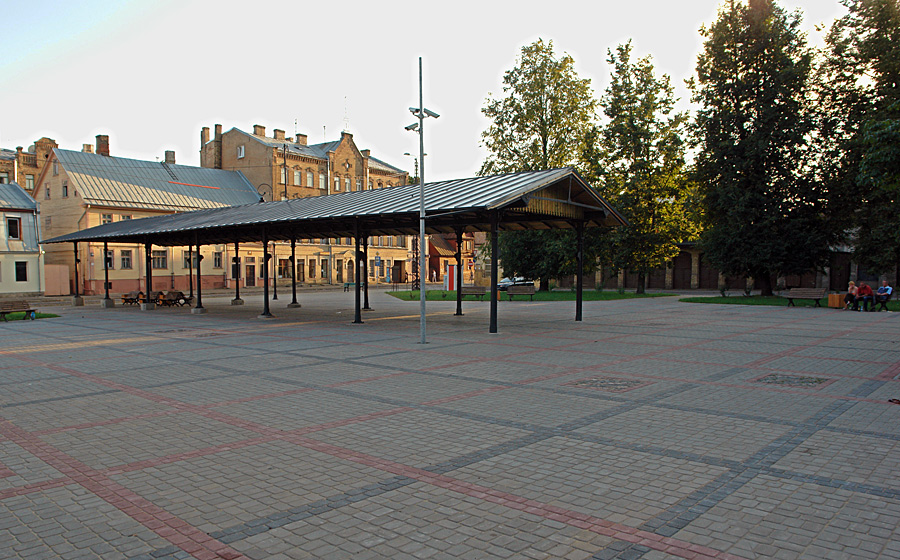
Hay Market

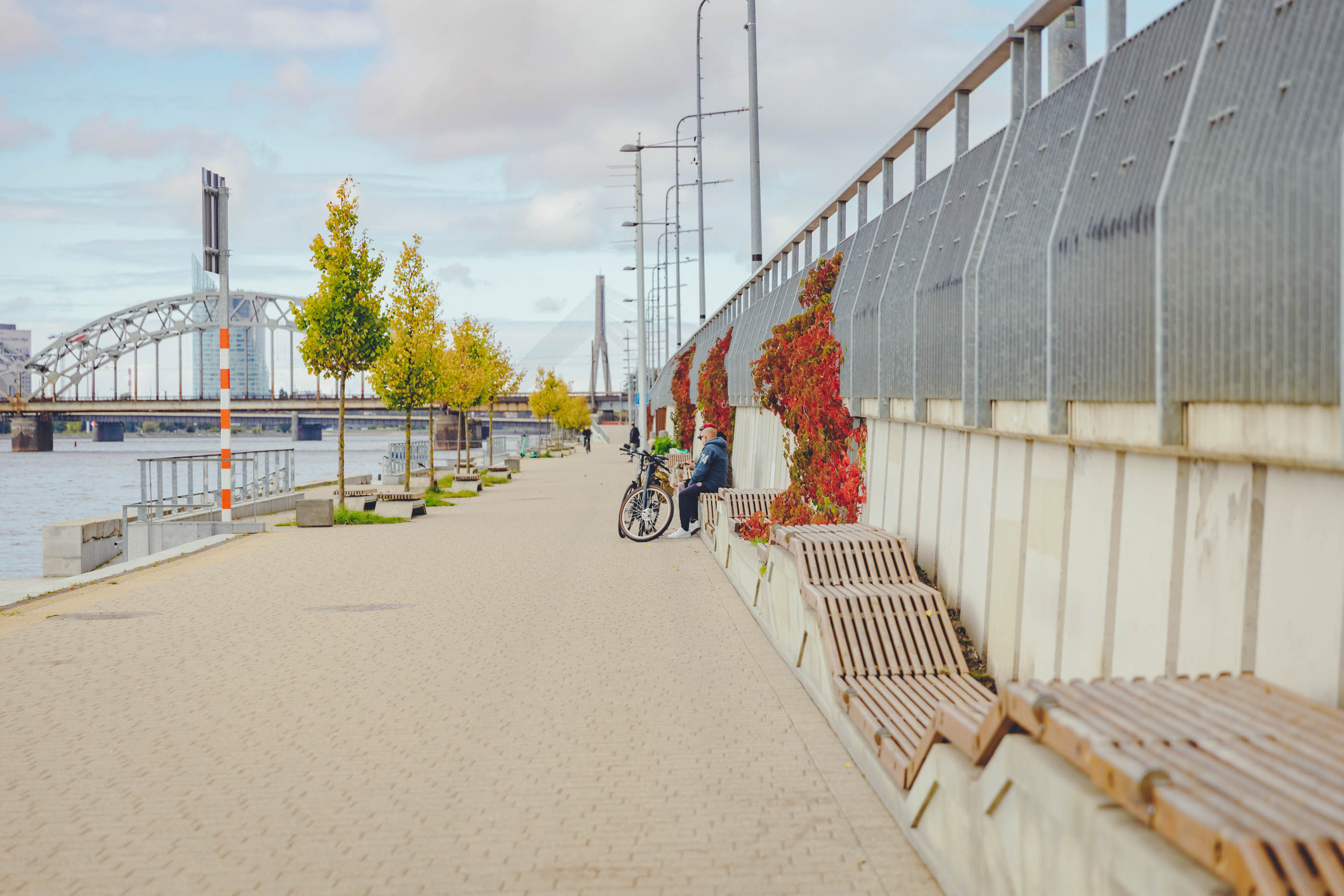
The Daugava promenade, near the Spīķeri quarter
