= Burning of the Riga synagogues =

1941 burning of synagogues by Nazi forces during the German occupation of Riga, Latvia

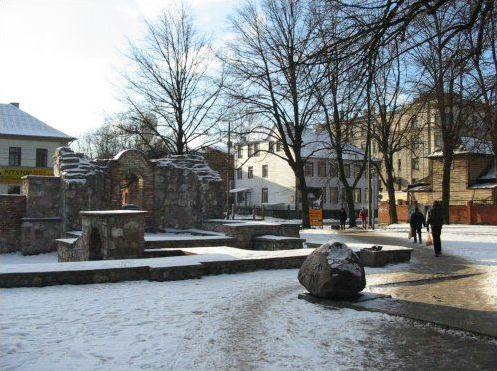
- Ruins of the Great Choral Synagogue, on Emīlijas Benjamiņas Street, in Riga
- Location: Riga, Latvia
- Date: July 1941
- Incident type: Intimidation, imprisonment, arson, mob killings, arbitrary executions, forced labor, mass murder
- Perpetrators: Franz Walter Stahlecker, Viktors Arājs, Herberts Cukurs
- Organizations: Nazi SS, Arajs Kommando
- Memorials: At ruins of Great Choral Synagogue in Riga

The burning of the Riga synagogues occurred in 1941, during the first days of the Nazi German occupation of the city of Riga, the capital and largest city in the country of Latvia. Many Jews confined in the synagogues died in the fires. Many other antisemitic measures were launched at the same time, ultimately followed by the murder of the vast majority of the Jews of Latvia.

== German occupation ==
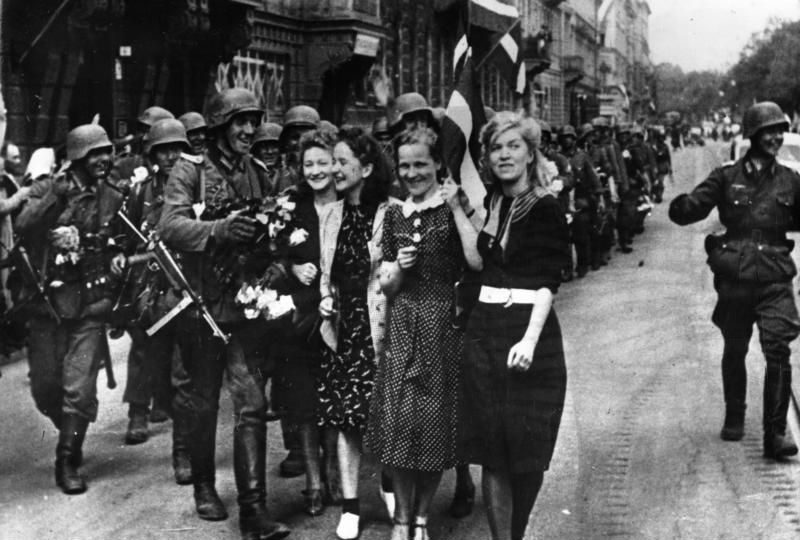
The original caption of this German propaganda photograph, published 7 July 1941 reads: "When the German troops took the city of Riga, the population there was elated. People who had suffered for months from the bloodshed, terror and had hidden themselves in the last weeks in the cellars of their houses, hurried now on the roads and town squares and thronged around the German soldiers to welcome them."

The German army crossed the border in the early morning of Sunday, June 22, 1941. All along the front, the Soviet armed forces suffered a crushing defeat. On June 29, 1941, the occupying Red Army began a disorganized withdrawal from Riga, then under German aerial bombardment. To slow the German advance, the retreating Soviets had blown up all the bridges over the Daugava river. The highest church spire in the city, St. Peter's, had been set on fire by German bombs. Some Soviet sympathizers in the city set out pails of water and gave bread to the retreating troops, but these were futile gestures amid the military disaster. On July 1, 1941, the German army entered Riga. There were about 40,000 Jews in the city at that time.

The occupying German forces were initially well-received by many of the civilians in Riga. From June 1940 to June 1941, the Soviet regime in Latvia had carried out a reign of terror against "anti-Soviet" elements. In Riga alone, thousands of men, women and children were arrested, with a majority never to be seen alive again. Consequently, much of the population perceived German occupation as the lesser evil.

== Actions against the Jews ==
Shortly after German troops entered the city on July 1, 1941, the Nazi occupation authorities incited Latvian nationalists to commit deadly anti-Jewish riots known as "pogroms". Within three months, more than 6,000 people were killed in Riga and the vicinity. Professionals such as lawyers, physicians and engineers in particular were targeted by the Nazis. Frida Michelson reported that they were singled out by fellow Latvian professionals from among the other Jews arrested and immediately shot. Large groups of prisoners were taken out of the Central Prison by truck to Bikernieki Forest, where they were shot. On July 2, at the instigation of the Germans, Latvian armed youths wearing red and white armbands went about the city dragging Jews out of their homes and arresting them. The Latvians assaulted a number of Jews, some so severely they died, and shot others. The same morning, all the telephones of Jewish homes were disconnected.

Pērkonkrusts (Thunder Cross or Swastika) was the name of the Latvian fascist party that was active in the 1930s. Members of Pērkonkrusts including, among others, Viktors Arājs and Herberts Cukurs cooperated with the Nazis in exterminating the Jews of Latvia. The university fraternities were also involved with the party. In July 1941, after the German occupation, Pērkonkrusts took over the house of the Jewish banker Schmulian, in Riga, at 19 Valdemara Street (Gorki Street under Soviet rule), to use as their headquarters. A Riga newspaper Tēvija, ("Fatherland") regularly published anti-Jewish propaganda, such as an editorial on July 11, 1941, entitled "The Jews—Source of Our Destruction".

The Jews arrested were taken to police headquarters (or "prefecture") and the Central Prison, also known as the Zentralka. Old and sick people were brought in naked. Young women were stripped naked and confined to cellars where they were raped. There were reports of women being raped in front of their husbands and children. Traditionally-attired Jews, especially those with beards, were targeted for humiliations such as dragging them around by their beards and forced shaving. Others were forced at gunpoint to put on the talith (prayer shawl) and tefillin (phylactery), then dance and sing Soviet songs. People, including non-Jews, were commonly accused by their enemies of "Communist-Jewish activities".

In the days following July 2, the Jews at the prefecture were marched out to perform forced labor, then confined back at the prefecture during the night. The Latvian Roberts Stiglics was in charge of the prefecture. Much of this was simply makework designed to humiliate and intimidate the Jews, although in at least one instance a small group of Jewish women was detailed to Jelgava to work in the fields for six weeks. According to Kaufmann, the Latvians were in charge this entire time. Among other things, they forced the Jews to sing Nazi songs and the "Internationale". The only Jews not subject to brutality at the hands of Latvian thugs were those who had been members of the Jewish Latvian Freedom Fighters Association (Latvian: Lačplēsis), but this immunity did not last. Professor Ezergailis, while not disputing Kaufmann's descriptions of the Latvians' activities, finds the things Kaufmann describes to have been typical of initial Nazi abuse of Jews in other locations. He also draws the inference that the lack of deliberate killings by the Latvians shows the Germans were at the root of the plans for the massacres.

== Destruction of the synagogues and cemeteries ==
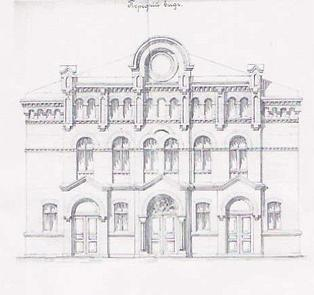
This synagogue on Stabu Street was burned on July 4, 1941. Max Kaufmann, a witness to the fire, stated that 30 Jews were burned alive inside.

Jews were rounded up and forced into synagogues, which were then set on fire. The Great Choral Synagogue, on Emīlijas Benjamiņas Street, was burned on July 4, 1941, with 20 Jews locked in the basement. Historian Press states that some of the victims were Lithuanian Jews who had taken refuge there. Gertrude Schneider identifies the victims as mostly women and children. Frida Michelson, a Latvian Jew who had been working near Jelgava in a forced labor detail when the synagogues were burned, reported that on her return to Riga, she was told by a friend (who had heard it from someone else) that the halls and the backyard of the Choral Synagogue were filled with refugees from Lithuania. Perkonkrusts and "other Latvian hangers-on" surrounded the building, trapped the people inside, and set it on fire. The burning of the synagogue was filmed by the Germans and later became part of a Wehrmacht newsreel, with the following narration: "The synagogue in Riga, which had been spared by the GPU commissars in their work of destruction, went up in flames a few hours later." According to Bernard Press, Herberts Cukurs, a Latvia air force officer, and his gang of thugs, burned the synagogue on Stabu Street, but only after dragging Jews out of the neighboring houses and locking them inside:

Eyewitnesses heard the people who were locked inside screaming for help and saw them breaking the synagogues windows from inside and trying, like living torches, to get outside. Cukurs shot them with his revolver.

The holy scrolls were dragged out of the synagogues and burned. According to the Press, many Jews wearing prayer shawls and talith went into the fires to save the scrolls, and were all killed. Ezergailis disputes this, stating that no one entered the flames trying to save the holy scrolls.

Only the Peitav Synagogue in the center of the city was not burned, and this was because of its location adjacent to apartment buildings and a church. The interior was however ransacked as had been all the other Jewish places of worship. The mob also attacked the Jewish cemeteries.

Kaufmann also describes a number of incidents of Jews being locked into synagogues by Latvians which were then set on fire, including:

* * * a vehicle full of armed Latvian volunteers drove to 9 Kalnu street in the Moscow suburb. All of the building's Jewish tenants were forced to leave it immediately and taken to the old Jewish cemetery. Here they were locked into the synagogue and burned alive in it.

Ezergailis does not find it credible that Jews were locked in the Great Choral Synagogue before it was set on fire. Ezergailis does acknowledge that there could have been 300 Lithuanian refugees in the synagogue before the fire was set. He postulates however that they would have been killed before the synagogue was set on fire.

Among the Jews killed in the synagogue massacres were Riga's Chief Rabbi Menachem Mendel Zack, his son-in-law Rabbi Moshe Kilov, cantor Mintz and his whole family, and Sarah Rashin (or Rashina), a 21-year-old internationally famed violinist. (Another source says that Sarah Rashina was killed at Rumbula on November 30, 1941.)

By July 16, 1941, Jews were no longer allowed on the streetcars of Riga. Armed Latvian policemen wearing red-white-red armbands arrested Jews on the streets. Those arrested were taken to the police prefecture near the railroad station and to other prisons.

== Further restrictions on Jews ==
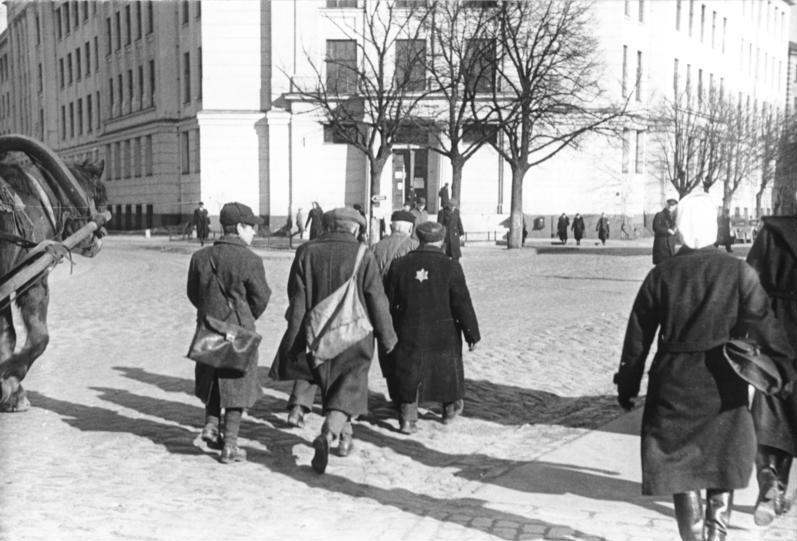
1942 photo showing Jews in Riga required to wear the yellow star and forbidden to use the sidewalk

At the end of July, the city administration switched from the German military to German civil administration. Head of the civil administration was a German named Nachtigall. Other Germans involved with the civil administration included Hinrich Lohse and Otto Drechsler. The Germans issued new decrees at this time to govern the Jews. Under "Regulation One", Jews were banned from public places, including city facilities, parks, and swimming pools. A second regulation required Jews to wear a yellow six-pointed star on their clothing, with violation punishable by death. A Jew was also to be allotted only one-half of the food ration of a non-Jew. By August, a German named Altmayer was in charge of Riga. The Nazis then registered all the Jews of Riga, and they further decreed that all Jews must wear a second yellow star, this one in the middle of their backs, and not use the sidewalks but walk in the roadway instead. Jews could be randomly assaulted with impunity by any non-Jew. The reason for wearing two stars was so Jews could readily be distinguished in a crowd. Later, when Lithuanian Jews were transported to the ghetto, they were subject to the same two-star rule.

Officially the Gestapo took over the prisons in Riga on July 11, 1941. By this time, the Latvian gangs had killed a number of the Jewish inmates. The Gestapo initially set up its headquarters in the former Latvian Ministry of Agriculture building on Raina Boulevard. A special Jewish administration was set up. Gestapo torture and similar interrogation tactics were carried out in the basement of this building. Anyone who happened to survive this treatment was then sent to prison, where the inmates were starved to death. The Gestapo later relocated to a former museum at the corner of Kalpaka and Alexander boulevards. The Nazis also set up a Latvian puppet government, under a Latvian general named Danker, who was himself half-German. A "Bureau of Jewish Affairs" was set up at the Latvian police prefecture. Nuremberg-style laws were introduced, which tried to force people in marriages between a Jew and a non-Jew to divorce. If the couple refused to divorce, the woman, if a Jew, would be forced to undergo sterilization. Jewish physicians were forbidden to treat non-Jews, and non-Jewish physicians were forbidden to treat Jews.

== Construction of the Riga ghetto ==
On July 21, the Riga occupation command decided to concentrate the Jewish workers in a ghetto. All Jews were registered; a Jewish council was also set up. Prominent Riga Jews, including Eljaschow, Blumenthal, and Minsker, were chosen to be on the council. All of them had been involved with the Jewish Latvian Freedom Fighters Association and it was hoped this would give them credibility in dealing with the occupation authorities. Council members were given large white armbands with a blue Star of David on them, which gave them the right to use the sidewalks and the streetcars. The Nazis issued an order that, by October 25, 1941, all Jews were to relocate to the Moscow suburb of Riga. As a result, about 30,000 Jews were concentrated in the small area known as the Moscow Forshtat by the end of October 1941. The Nazis fenced them in with barbed wire. Anyone who went too close to the barbed wire was shot by the Latvian guards stationed around the ghetto perimeter. German police (Wachmeister) from Danzig commanded the guards. The guards engaged in random firing during the night. Thirty-five days after the Riga ghetto was established, 24,000 of its inhabitants were force marched out of the city and shot at the nearby forest of Rumbula.
