= Great Choral Synagogue (Riga) =

Destroyed synagogue in Riga, Latvia

- Latvian: Rīgas Horālā sinagoga Hebrew: בית הכנסת כורל של ריגה
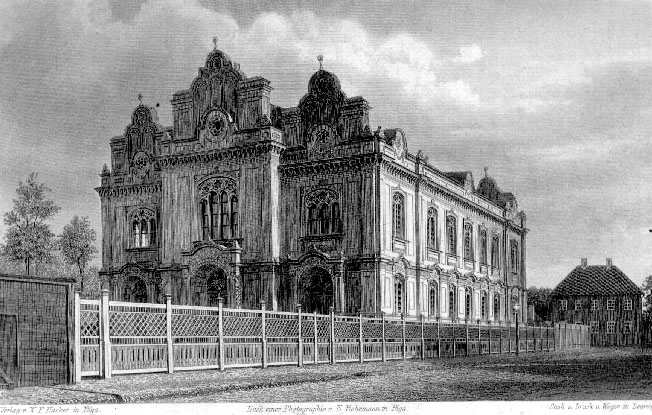
- Great Choral Synagogue, before 1906

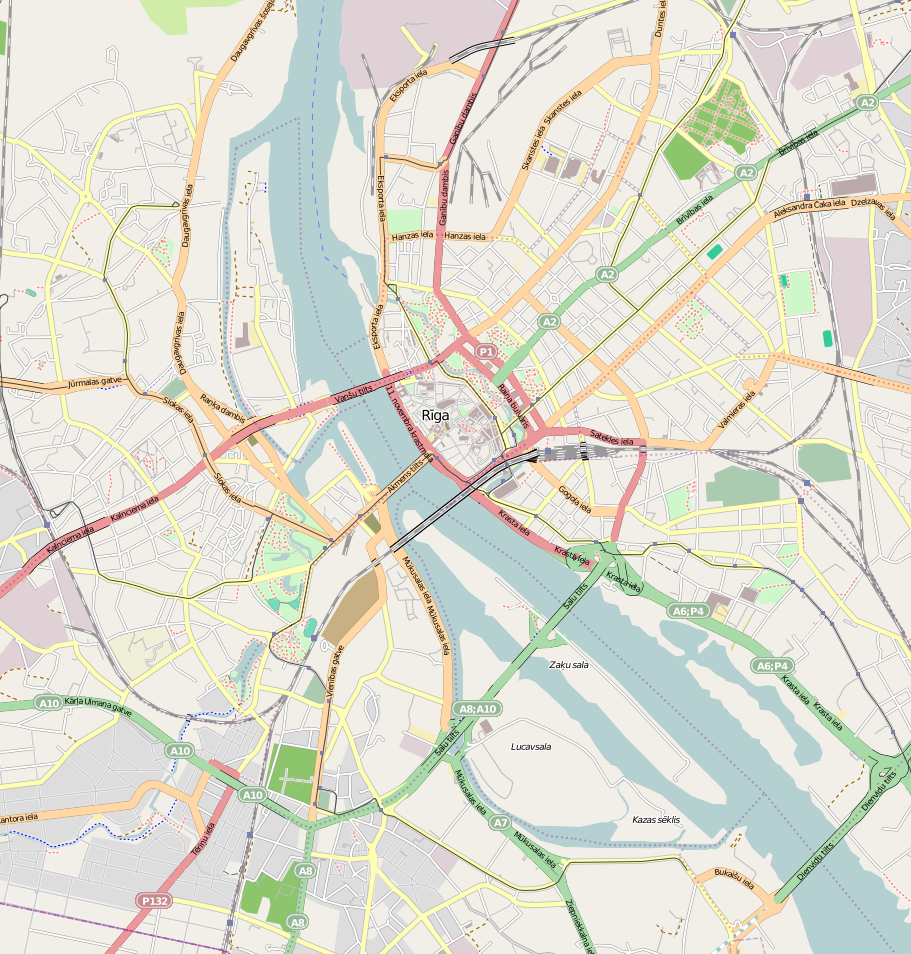
- Location of the destroyed synagogue in Riga

Religion
- Affiliation: Judaism (former)
- Ecclesiastical or organizational status: Synagogue (1871–1941)
- Status: Destroyed

Location
- Location: Gogoļa iela (Gogol Street), Riga
- Country: Latvia
- Interactive map of Great Choral Synagogue
- Coordinates: 56°56′33″N 24°7′35″E

Architecture
- Architect: Paul von Hardenack
- Type: Synagogue architecture
- Style: Renaissance Revival
- Groundbreaking: 1868
- Completed: 1871
- Destroyed: 4 July 1941
- Materials: Brick

The Great Choral Synagogue (Latvian: Rīgas Horālā sinagoga; Hebrew: בית הכנסת כורל של ריגה) was a Jewish congregation and synagogue, that was located on Gogoļa iela (Gogol Street), in the Latgale neighborhood of Riga, Latvia. Designed by Paul von Hardenack in predominately Renaissance Revival style, the synagogue was completed in 1871. It was the largest synagogue in Riga, until it was burned down on 4 July 1941 during the German occupation of Latvia.

== History ==
The synagogue was designed in 1868 by architect Paul von Hardenack and the building was completed in 1871. The architecture consisted of several different styles, however, Renaissance Revival was the dominant style. The synagogue was famous throughout the city for its cantors and its choir.

=== Destruction ===
The synagogue was burned down on 4 July 1941 after the German Nazi occupation of Riga. There are reports that 20 Jews were locked in the basement. Historian Bernhard Press states that some of the victims were Lithuanian Jews who had taken refuge there. Gertrude Schneider identifies the victims as mostly women and children. Frida Michelson, a Latvian Jew who had been working near Jelgava in a forced labor detail when the synagogue was burned, reported that she was told by a friend (who had heard it from someone else) that the halls and the backyard of the Choral Synagogue were filled with refugees from Lithuania. Perkonkrusts and "other Latvian hangers-on" surrounded the building, trapped the people inside, and set it on fire. Andrew Ezergailis does not find it credible that Jews were locked in the Great Choral Synagogue before it was set on fire. Ezergailis does acknowledge that there could have been 300 Lithuanian refugees in the synagogue before the fire was set. He postulates however that they would have been killed before the synagogue was set on fire.

The destruction of the synagogue was filmed by the Germans and later became part of a Wehrmacht newsreel, with the following narration: "The synagogue in Riga, which had been spared by the GPU commissars in their work of destruction, went up in flames a few hours later."

=== Demolition and memorial ===
After the war, the remains of the burnt-out synagogue were demolished by Soviet authorities and the area was turned into a public square, with the first commemorative stone marking a Star of David being placed at the location only in 1988. After the restoration of Latvia's independence, a memorial designed by Latvian architect Sergejs Rižs in the shape of the synagogue walls with built-in archaeological remains of the original building found at the site, was erected on the grounds in 1993. In 2007 a memorial to Jānis Lipke and others who had saved Jews from the Holocaust was unveiled next to the 1993 memorial. The memorial commemorates all those who helped save more than 400 Jews from certain death.

== Gallery ==
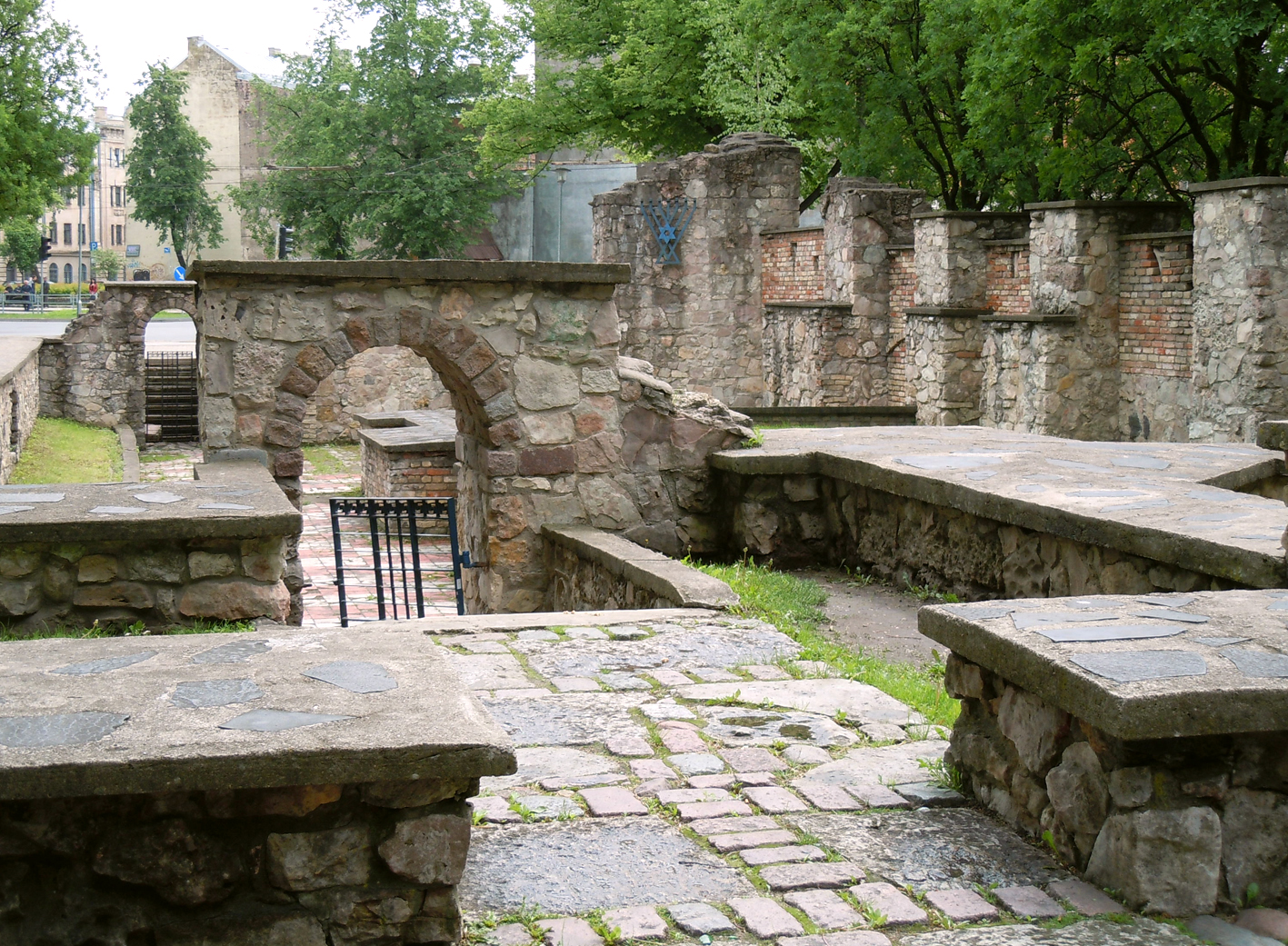
Ruins of the synagogue, rebuilt in 1993

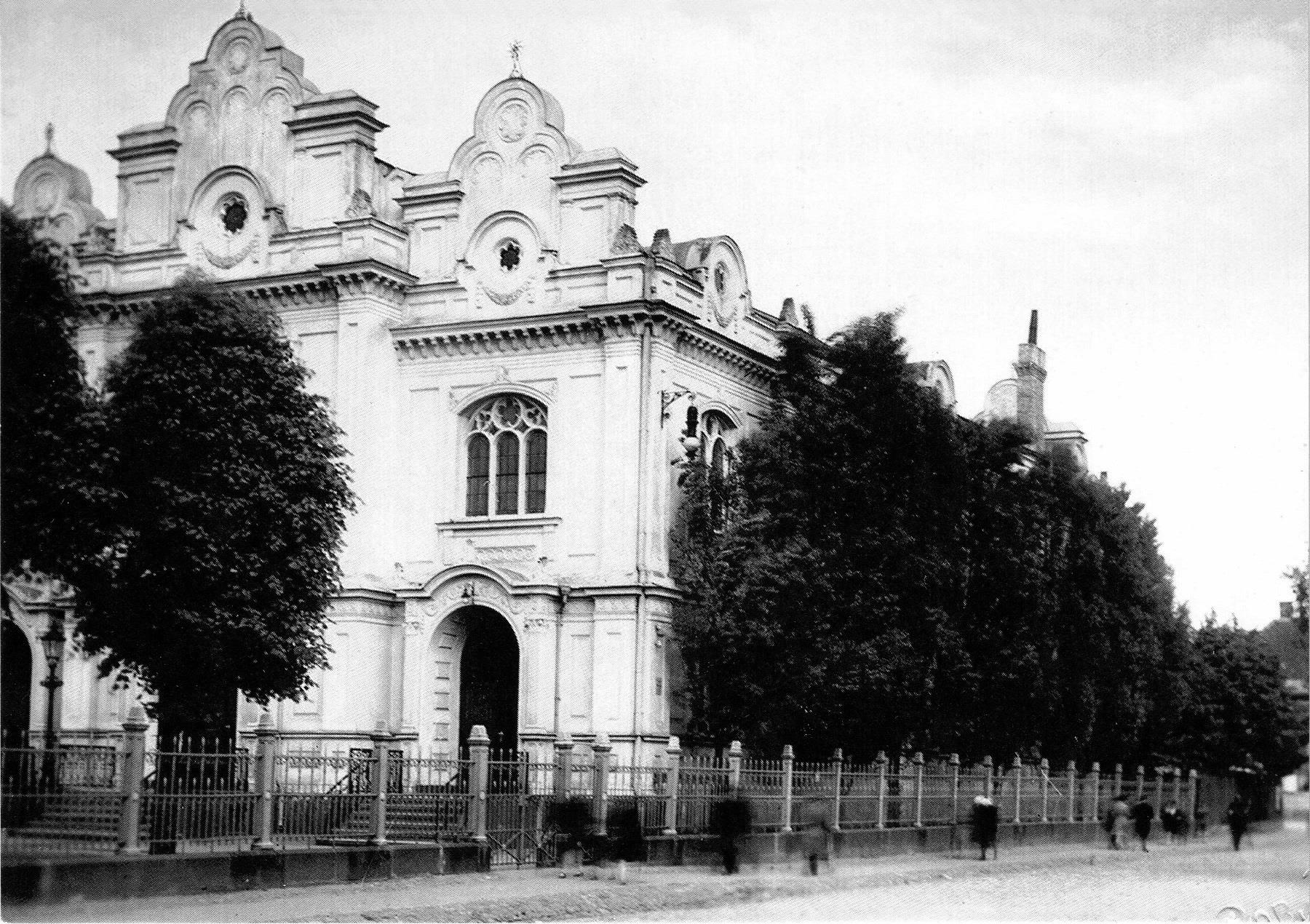
Great Choral Synagogue in the 1930s

== See also ==
- History of the Jews in Latvia
- List of synagogues in Latvia
