= Church of the Theotokos of Kazan, Riga =

Church building in Riga, Latvia

Coordinates: 56°56′32.89″N 24°08′47.52″E

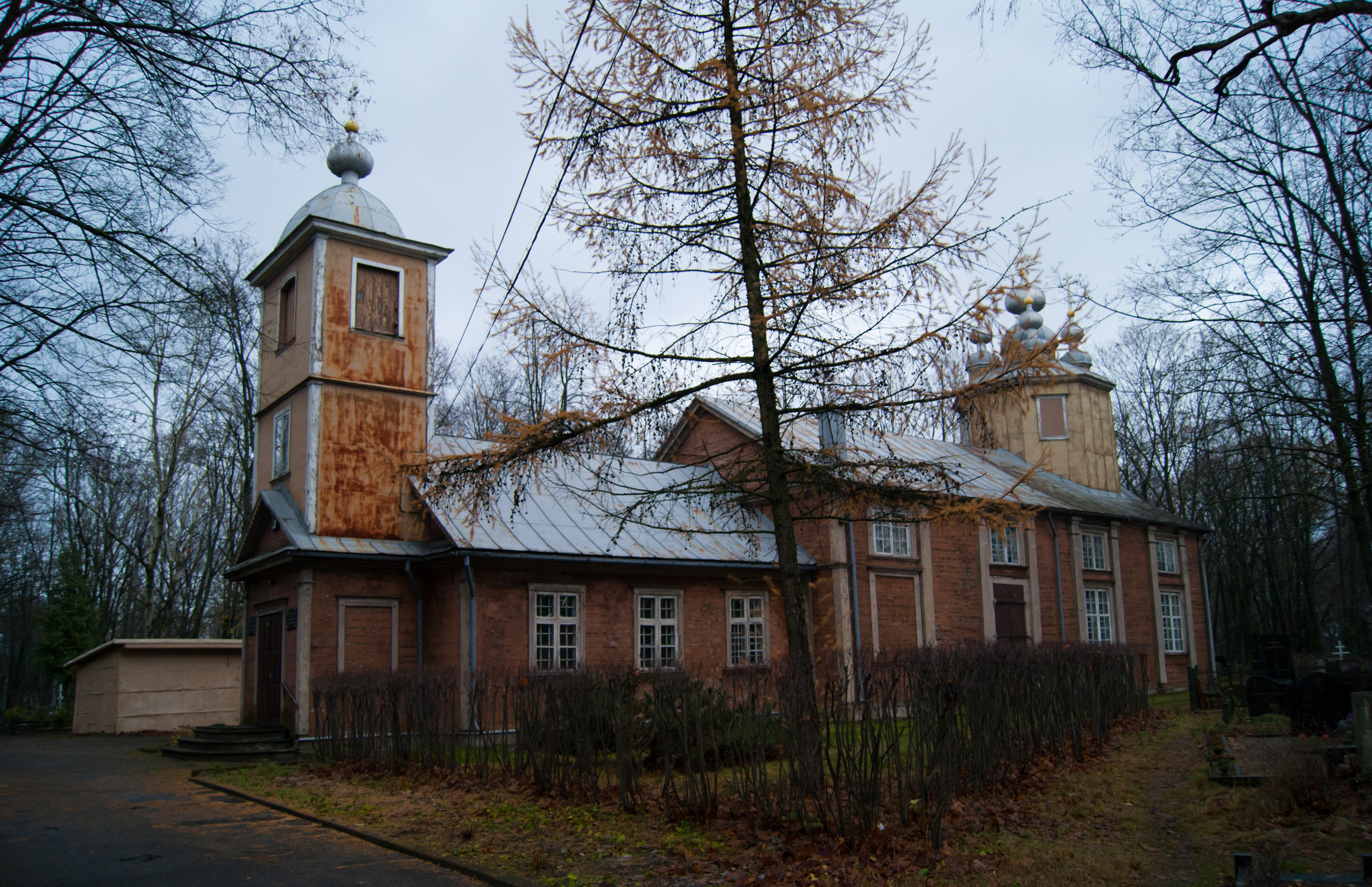
Church of the Theotokos of Kazan

Theotokos of Kazan Church (Latvian: Kazaņas Dievmātes ikonas pareizticīgo baznīca) is an Eastern Orthodox church in Riga, the capital of Latvia. The church is located at Kalna iela 21B.
