= Church of Jesus, Riga =

Church building in Riga, Latvia

Church of Jesus
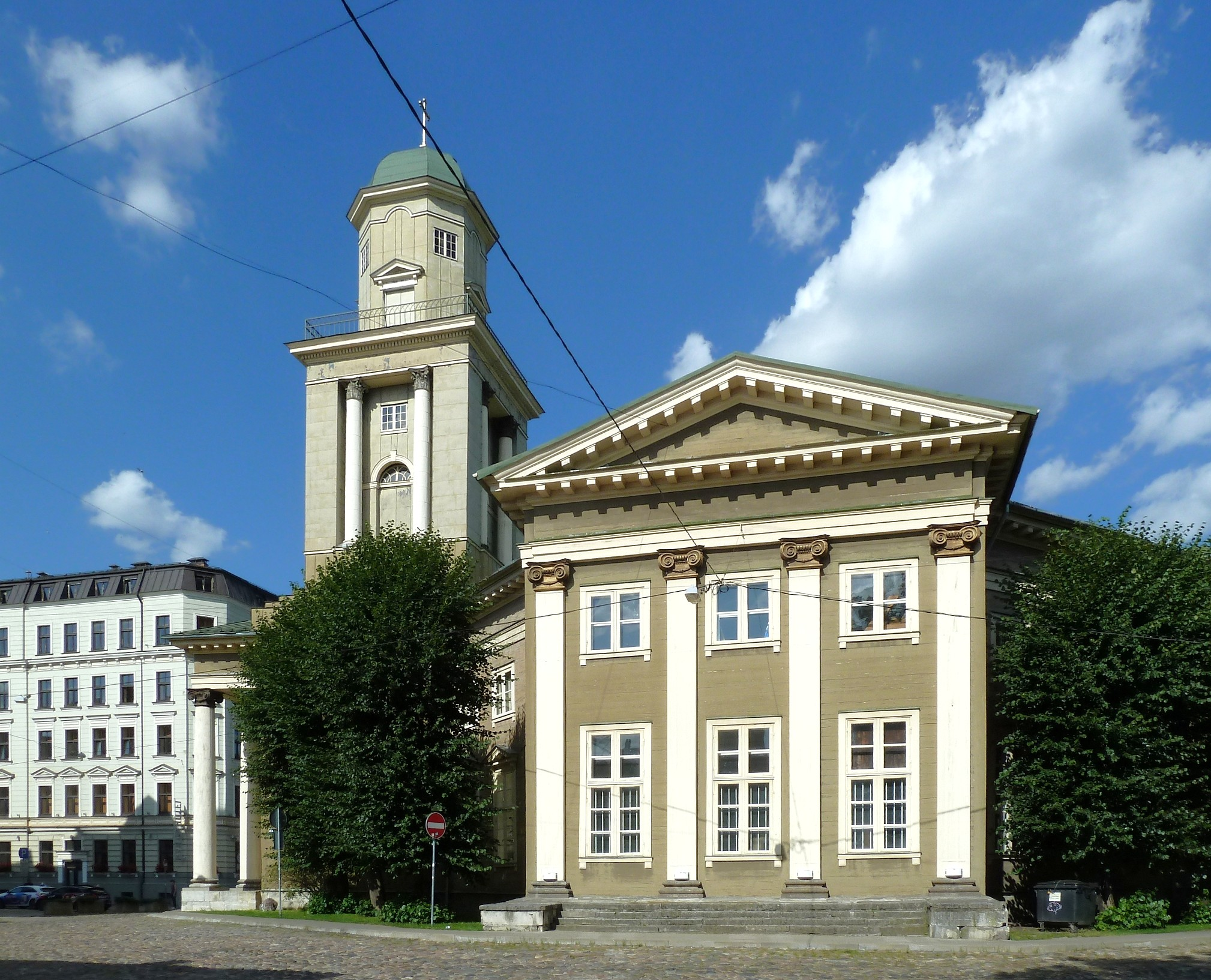
- Church of Jesus

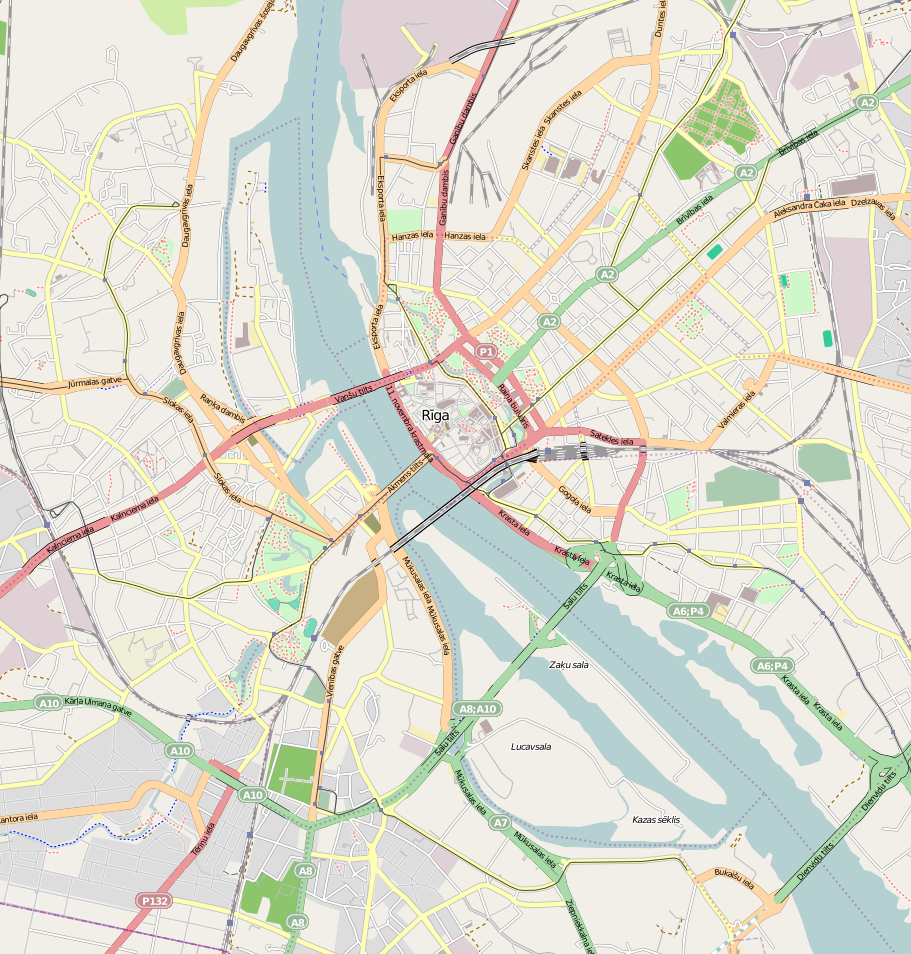
- Location within Riga
- 56°56′30″N 24°07′24″E
- Location: Riga
- Country: Latvia
- Denomination: Lutheran

Church of Jesus (Latvian: Jēzus evaņģēliski luteriskā baznīca) is a Lutheran church in Riga, the capital of Latvia. It is a parish church of the Evangelical Lutheran Church of Latvia. The church is situated at the address 18 Elijas Street.

== History ==
In common with other ancient suburban parish churches in Riga, the church building has been destroyed and rebuilt on a number of occasions, as a result of war or siege. The first church building was built in the seventeenth century; the foundation stone was laid in 1635, and it was consecrated in 1638. The present building was completed in 1822 and is the largest wooden classical building in Latvia.

== Current work ==
The church has an active congregation. It is located in the more impoverished part of Riga, south-east of the old town, behind the imposing Latvian Academy of Sciences building. There is a particular ministry to young people, with some services offering lively musical accompaniment and leadership by young people. There is an active children's ministry and the church claims to have the largest Sunday School in Latvia.
