= All Saints Church, Riga =

Church in Latvia

All Saints Church
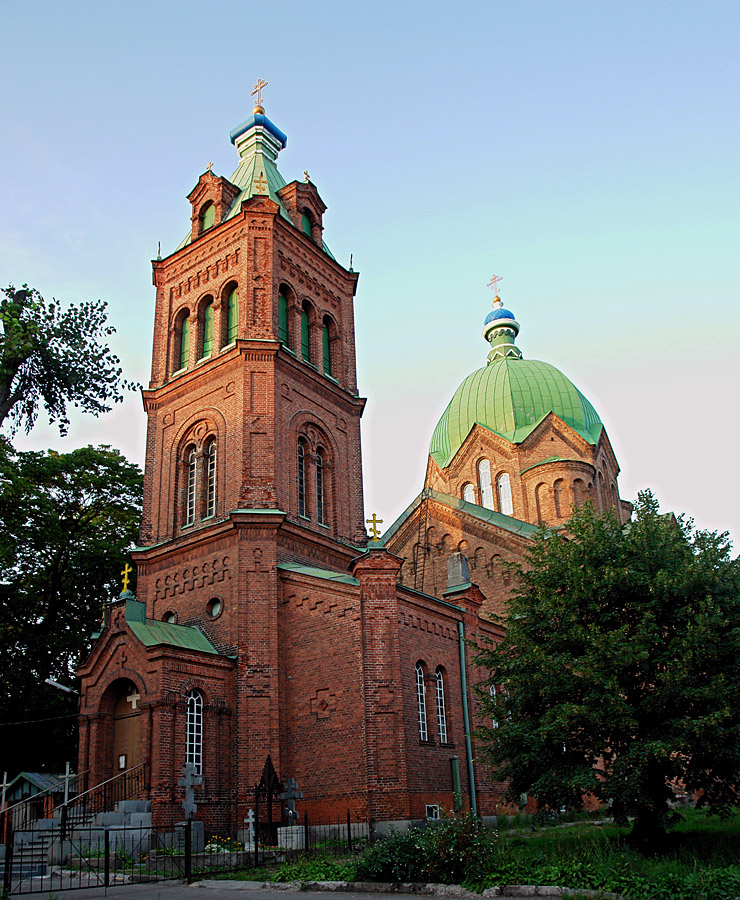

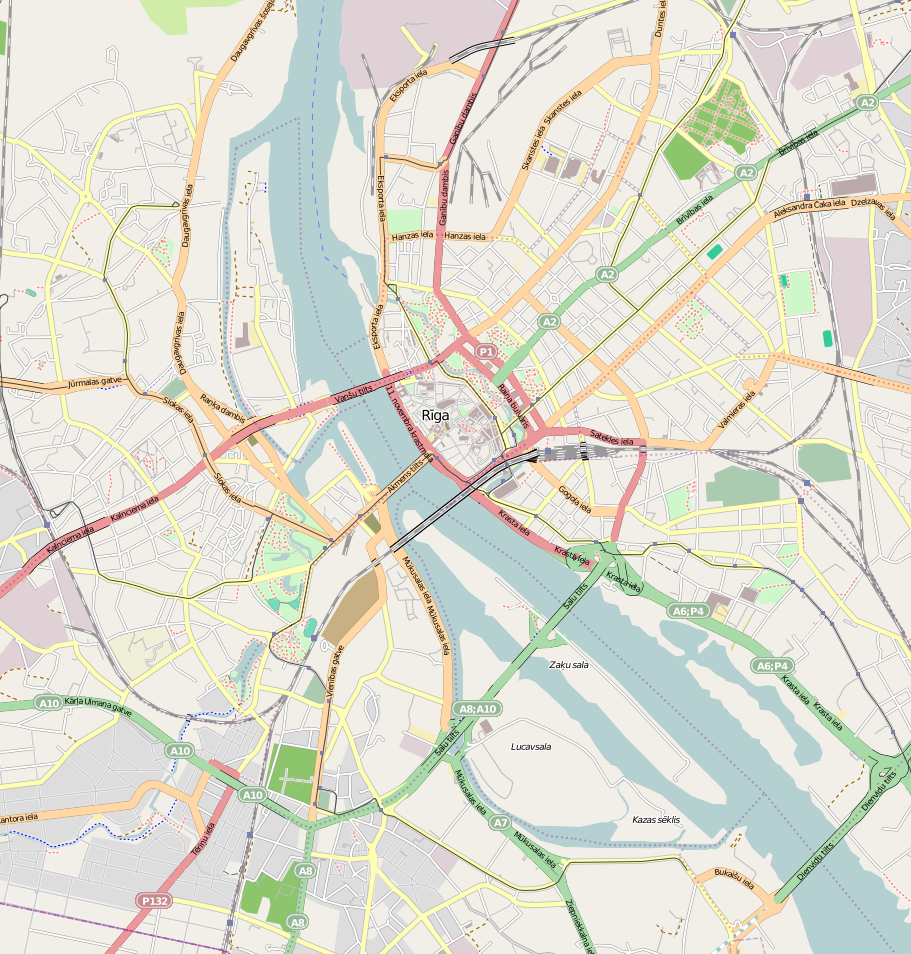
- Location within Riga
- 56°56′31.90″N 24°8′14.13″E
- Location: Riga
- Country: Latvia
- Denomination: Eastern Orthodox

All Saints Church (Latvian: Visu Svēto pareizticīgo baznīca) is an Eastern Orthodox church in Riga, the capital of Latvia. The church is situated at the address Katoļu iela 10a.
