= Riga Nordic University =

University in Riga, Latvia

- Rīgas Ziemeļvalstu augstskola
- Former name: ISMA
- Motto: Ubi concordia, ibi victoria (Where there is unity, there is victory)
- Type: Private
- Established: 1994; 32 years ago
- Rector: Deniss Djakons
- Location: Valerijas Seiles iela 1-5, Riga, Latvia; 56°56′17″N 24°09′31″E
- Website: rnu.lv
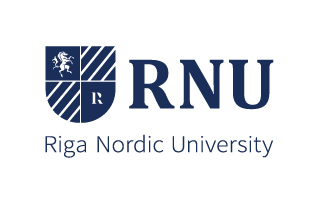

Riga Nordic University (Latvian: Rīgas Ziemeļvalstu augstskola); Formerly known as Information System Management College (Latvian: Informācijas sistēmu menedžmenta augstskola); the holding, which provides education starting with pre-school preparation in secondary school “Premjers” to doctoral studies at the university. The central office of RNU is located in EU, Latvia, Riga. RNU has two official branches in Riga, Latvia and in Fergana, Uzbekistan – international branch.

== RNU structure ==
- Premjers Secondary School;
- International School Premjers for 5-9 grade;
- Publisher center, which publishes scientific and study literature;
- Scientific Research Institutes conduct promising research and development work;
- University provides education for all levels – from short-cycle to doctoral degree.

== Studies at RNU ==
=== Short-cycle ===
Duration of studies: 2 years

- Real Estate Entrepreneurship
- Entrepreneurship in Restaurant Business
- Applied information Technology

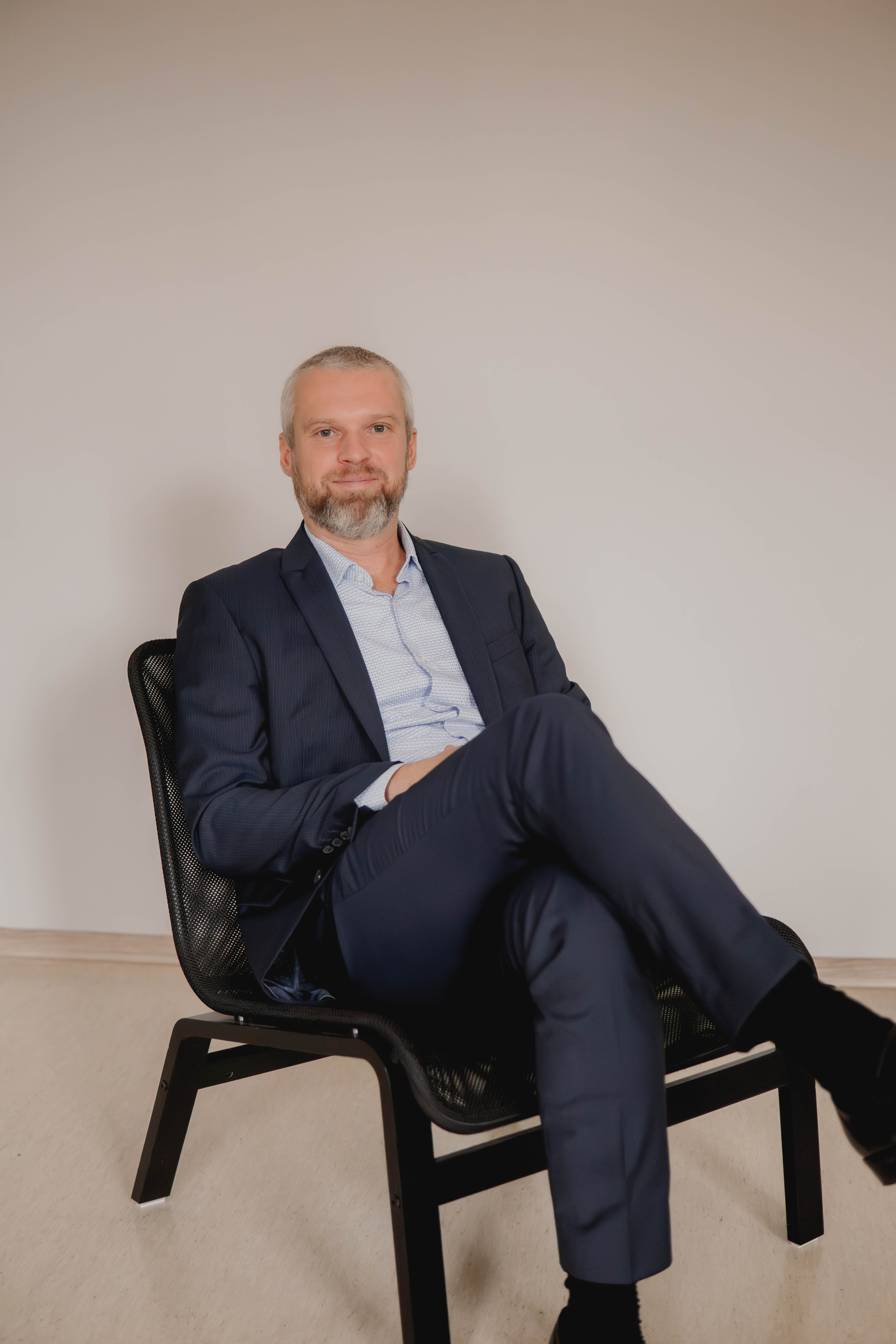
RNU Rector Deniss Djakons

=== Professional bachelor ===
Duration of studies: 4 years

- Business Administration
  - Business Administration
  - Music Management
  - Business Communication
- Business Administration in Tourism
  - Tourism and Hospitality Management
  - Restaurant and Club Business Management
  - Digital Technologies in Tourism
- Information Systems
  - Telecommunication Systems
  - Computer Systems Administration and Safety
  - Intellectual Education Systems
  - Applied Systems of Computer Modelling
  - Applied Electronics Computing Systems
  - Web Technologies
  - Computer Design and Media Technologies
  - Unmanned Systems Programming
- Psychology
- Business Administration (Global BBA)

=== Master's degree ===
Duration of studies: 1–3 years

- Business Administration
  - Information technology management
- Computer Systems
  - Quantitative Enterprise Risk Management
  - Enterprise Risk Management
  - Administration and Safety of Computer Systems
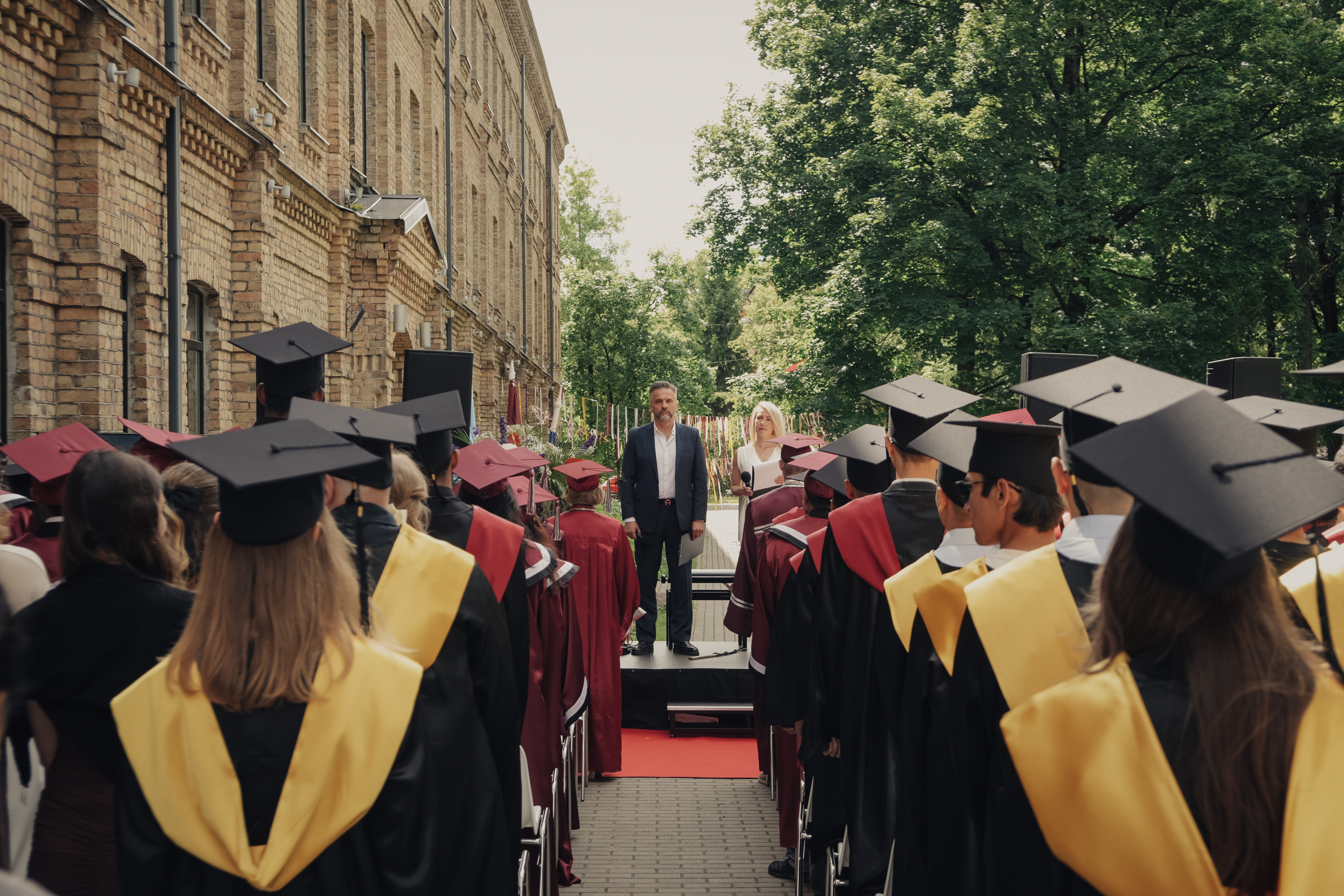
  - Graduation 2025
    Telecommunication Systems
  - Intellectual Teaching Systems
  - Applied Systems of Computer Modelling
  - Information Systems of Web Technologies
  - Calculation and Information Systems of Applied Electronics
- Organizational Psychology

== History ==
=== RNU 2025 ===
From September 2025, ISMA will be renamed to RNU.

Rector: "ISMA has become Riga Nordic University because we want to strengthen our connection with the Nordic region and be more visible internationally.

The new name helps us attract students from the Nordic countries and beyond, and it reflects our openness and modern approach to education.

Our top priority is raising the quality of studies to meet international standards.

We are expanding partnerships with universities and companies abroad, offering more opportunities for practice and exchange programs.

Riga Nordic University is a place where students gain competitive knowledge and skills for the future job market."

=== ISMA 2015 ===
In 2015 ISMA is a modern, dynamically developing university with a broad range of study programs and specializations at all levels, from short-cycle to doctoral.

Also, ISMA structure includes private secondary school Premjers and private vocational school Sigma, which trains young specialists in arts, graphic design and computer modeling.

Currently, ISMA has a big structure of departments that work on organization of the study process, employment of the students, expanding experience and skills by participating in local and international conferences, as well as organizing sports, recreation and entertainment activities of the university.

In the past 10 years ISMA has become an international education institution: one third of the students are citizens of Russia, Ukraine, China, Uzbekistan, etc.

=== ISMA 2011 ===
In 2011, ISMA moves to its own renovated building. Now the secondary school, the college and the university are situated in one place, which optimizes the study process and its coordination. A separate building is suited for the administration.

Vocational School Sigma becomes a part of ISMA, which allows broadening the spectrum of the services provided.

In 2008, ISMA obtains the license for the Doctoral program in Business Administration.

=== ISMA 2005 ===
ISMA continues dynamic and up-to-date development. Because of the growing demand for higher education ISMA opens its branches in Kiev, Daugavpils, Ventspils and Balvi.

ISMA develops its corporate style, which is still used nowadays.

=== Coat of arms ===
The basis of the coat of arms is a classical German shield. In its center the shield bears a golden-fimbriated heraldic animal - a golden-maned silver unicorn against a maroon background to represent the colour of the Latvian flag. To this have been added a motto - Ubi Concordia, Ibi Victoria (Latin), meaning "Where there is consent, there is victory", which appears just above the unicorn. Below these is the acronym that stands for the higher educational institution - ISMA. The date of its foundation written in a classical Latin style appears at the base. The coat of arms is mounted into an exquisite (elegant) frame of silver and gold and is bound by a laurel wreath. The arms is surmounted by a golden-tasselled cappit - the symbol of academism and science, while a scroll bound by a golden ribbon represents the significance of knowledge.

The colours of the coat of arms:

- Maroon (purple) - the symbol of virtue, strength, might and unity.
- Golden (yellow) - the symbol of wealth, justice, generosity and the bright future.
- Silver (white) - the symbol of purity, innocence, youthfulness and hope.

The heraldic animal: Unicorn - a mythical animal, a running horse (capable of transforming into other animals) with a long, straight, golden horn at the forehead - the symbol of purity and virginity.

Flag: The formula of the flag: the triband of blue, white and blue BWB (blue-white-blue; 4:5:4). Blue associates with a higher power and nobleness of descent, bearing serenity and dignity. White stands for purity of thoughts, rectification and deity, openness and obscurity. The coat of arms appears in the center of the white strip symbolizing the eternal search for the truth.

The lyrics of the anthem of ISMA were written by Prof. Dr.sc.ing. Yury Shunin.

=== ISMA 1994 ===
In 1994, on the basis of Riga Aviation University several private higher education institutions were founded, one of which was Information Systems Management Institute. Three directions of studies were accredited almost at once. These were Business Administration, Information Technologies and Tourism.

The institute was led by its current president Prof. Dr.sc.ing. Roman Dyakon.

The administration of the institute has settled on the innovative development, and that is why a lot of attention has been paid to technical support of the study process and application of the newest technologies in the work of the whole institution.

== Scientific activity ==
=== Publications ===
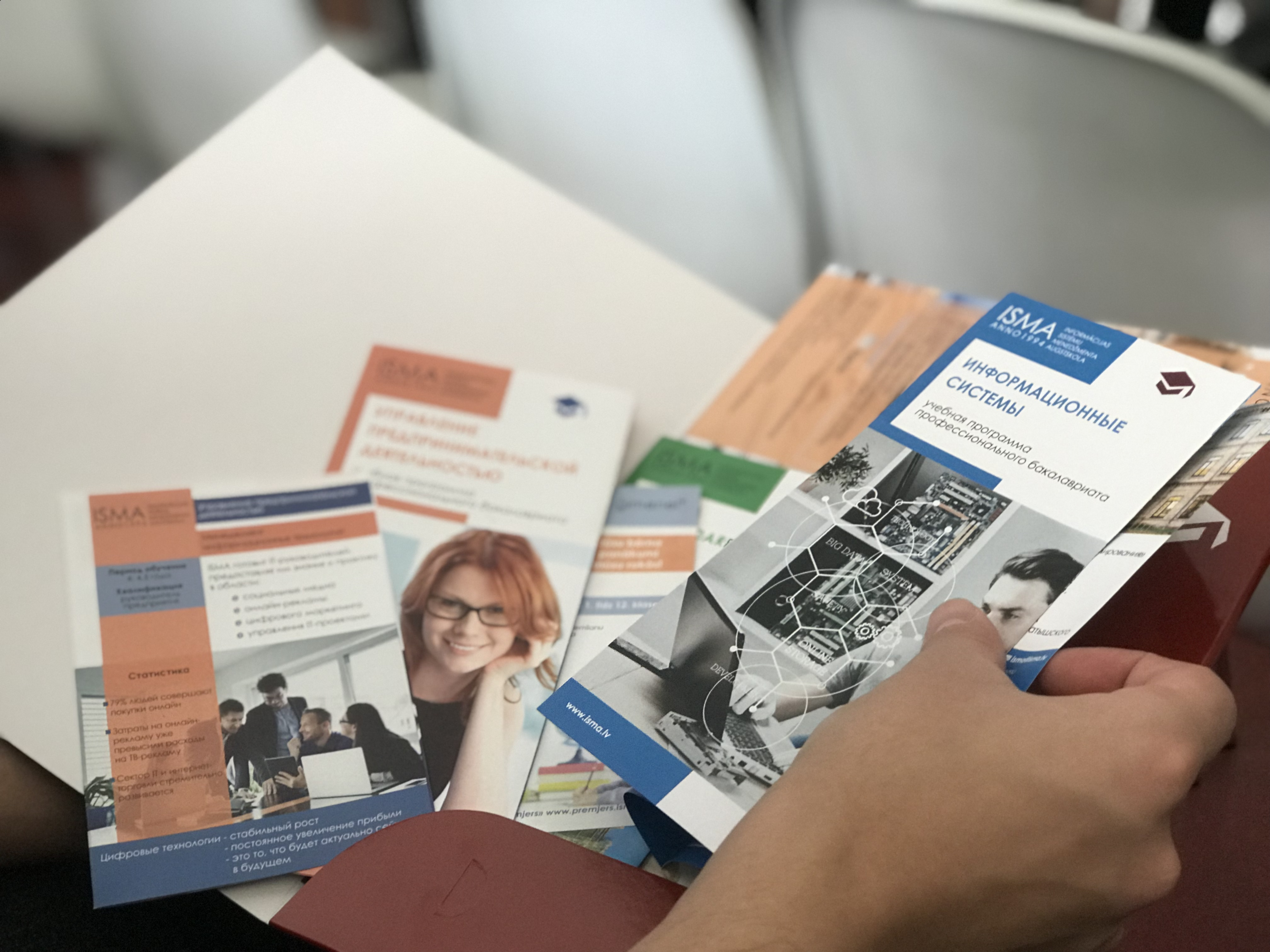

A range of periodicals publishes the works of students and scientist from Latvia and from other countries of the world.

- Information Technologies, Management and Society
- Economics and Education
- Information Society Review
- IT&M Conference Theses

=== Conferences ===
RNU traditionally holds several annual international conferences in the field of achievements and new developments in science and education, international cooperation of the university with various international companies and organisations, and new technologies, which are applied in modern educational process. The scientific team of RNU is always open to new cooperation in these spheres.

- Information Technologies and Management
- Open Learning and Distance Education
- Internship & Employment

== Annual events ==
- Knowledge Day
- Freshman Day
- Conference ”Internship and Employment”
- Career Days
- International Conference “Open Learning and Distance Education”
- Educational studios for high school students
- Master class “How to become successful”
- International scientific conference “Information Technologies and Management”
- Olympiad “ISMA Intellect”
- International mathematics competition “Kangaroo”
- Summer camp for elementary school pupils
- Summer school for students
- Academic readings
- Students' international internship
- Entertaining quest games
