= Holy Archangel Mikhail Church, Riga =

Church building in Riga, Latvia

Holy Archangel Mikhail Church
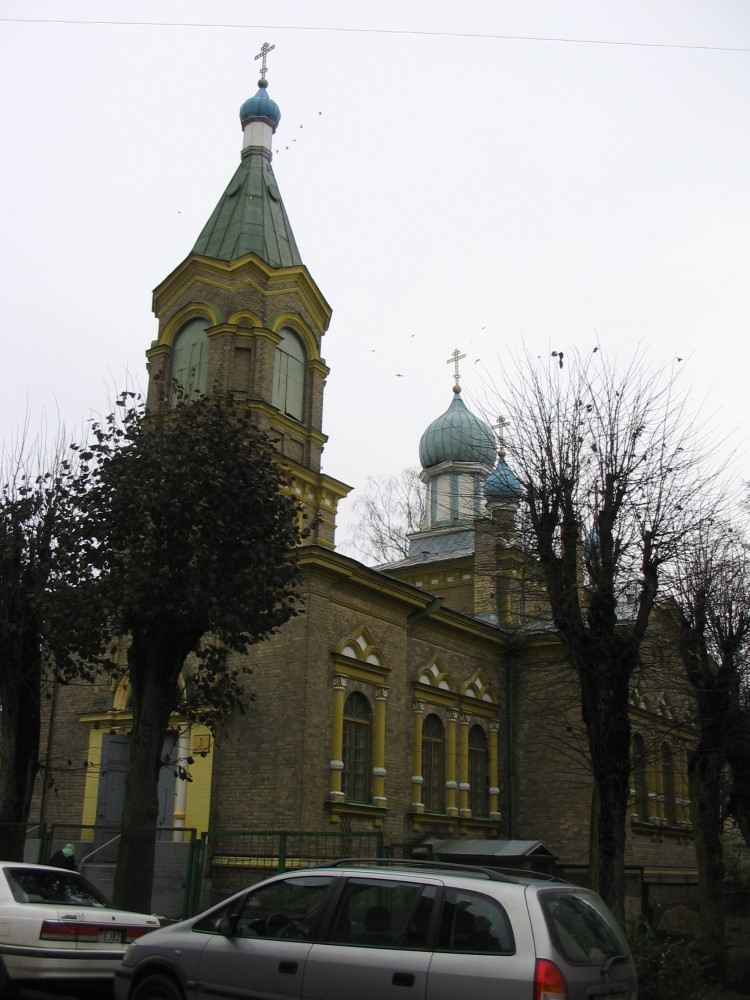

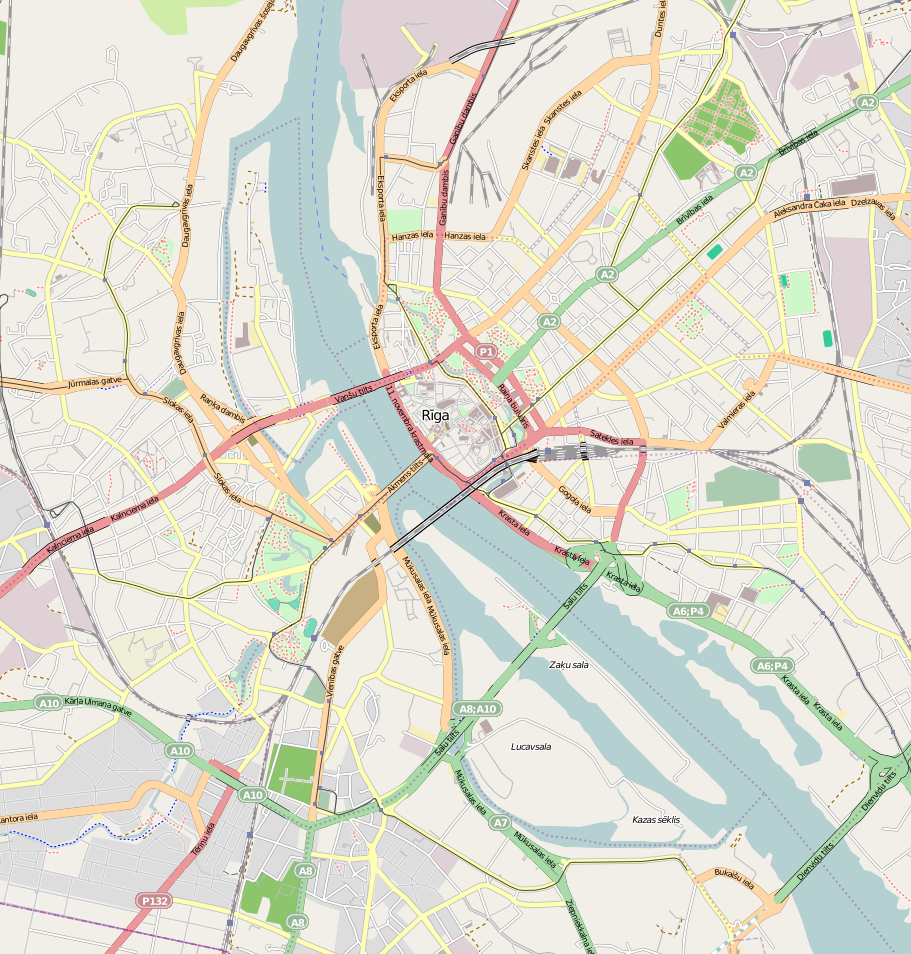
- Location within Riga
- 56°56′6.40″N 24°9′24.74″E
- Location: Riga
- Country: Latvia
- Denomination: Eastern Orthodox

Holy Archangel Mikhail Church (Latvian: Svētā Erceņģeļa Mihaila pareizticīgo baznīca) is an Eastern Orthodox church in Riga, the capital of Latvia. The church is situated at the address 170 Latgales Street.
