= Sniķera sala =

Island in Riga, Latvia

- Location within Latvia
- Interactive map of Sniķera sala

Geography
- Location: Lake Ķīšezers
- Coordinates: 57°2′8″N 24°8′5″E

Administration
- Latvia

Sniķera sala is a small island in the Northern District of Riga, located in the northwest end of Lake Ķīšezers, close to the Mīlgrāvis Canal which connects Ķīšezers and the Daugava, near Vecmīlgrāvis Bridge. It is a part of the Trīsciems neighbourhood.

The length of the island in 320 m, the width - 90 m. The island is flat and uninhabited, with just a few trees.
