= Riga State German Grammar School =

School in Riga, Latvia

- Rīgas Valsts vācu ģimnāzija
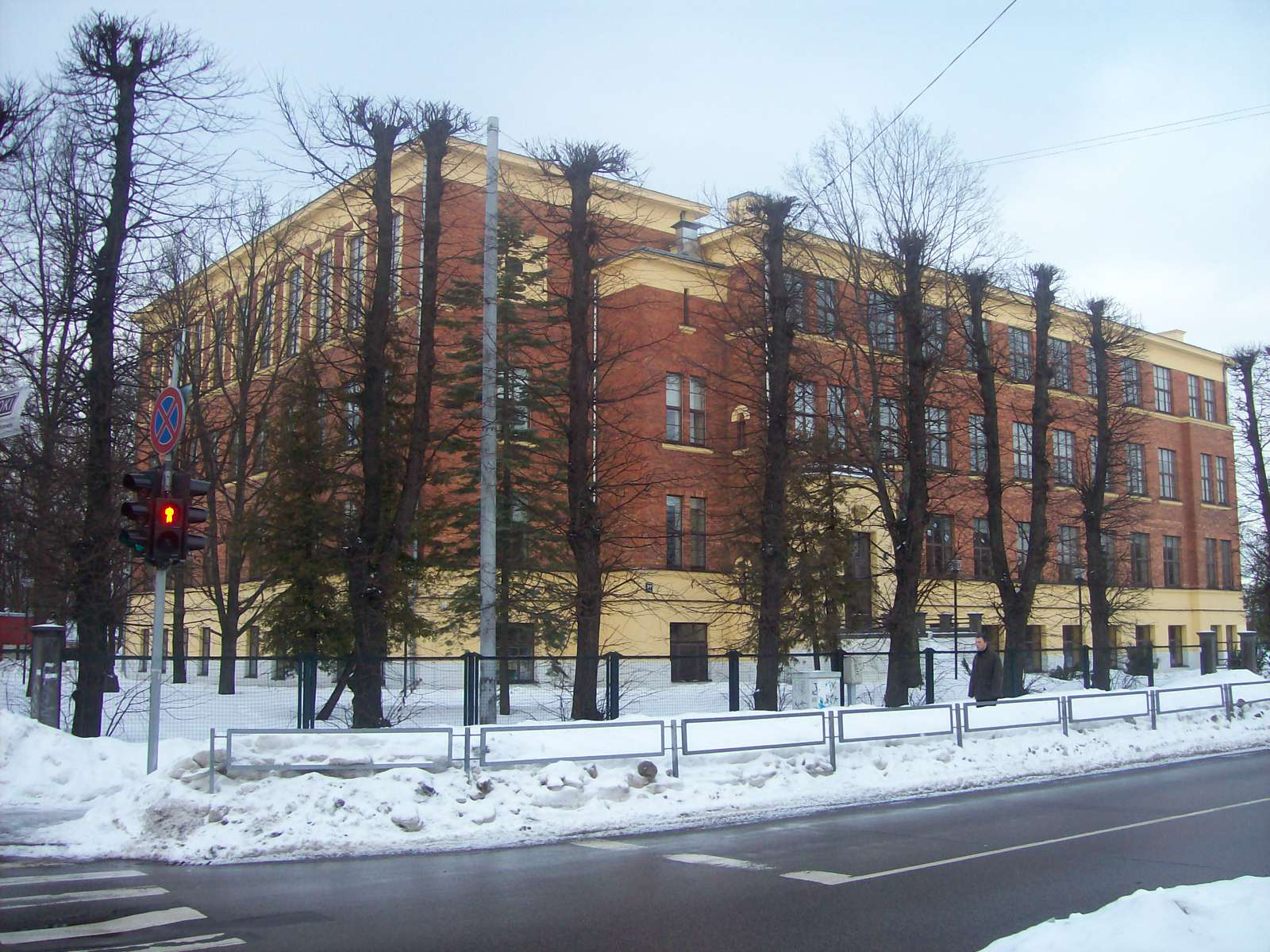

Location
- 21 Āgenskalna street Riga, LV-1002; Latvia
- Coordinates: 56°56′51″N 24°03′48″E

Information
- School type: State Gymnasium
- Motto: Englisch ist ein Muss, Deutsch ist ein Plus. (English is a necessity, German is a plus.)
- Established: 1921
- Principal: Gundega Muceniece
- Grades: From 7 till 12
- Classes: 26

Riga State German Grammar School (Latvian: Rīgas Valsts vācu ģimnāzija) is a state gymnasium-level school located at 21 Agenskalns street, Riga, the capital of Latvia.

Since 1962, the Riga State German Grammar School provides in-depth, and is also a centre conducting the DSD (Deutsches Sprachdiplom) German language proficiency diploma examination. The School offers 2 programmes for the 2nd phase of, as well as 4 comprehensive secondary education programmes and provides education to children from class 7 to 12.

== History ==
=== The period of the first independent Latvian state ===
Originally the school with 49 started its work as the State Pārdaugava Secondary School directed by its first principal Pēteris Aivars (Ļūļaks) on 19 September 1921 and at that time used the premises of the Primary School No.16 and the City Library No. 2 at the corner of Dārtas and Zeļļu streets (presently, the location of the Primary School named after Fricis Brīvzemnieks).

In the following year, the school was renamed the piemiņa, to be renamed again in 1931 as the Riga State Gymnasium No. 2. In the spring of 1930, the foundation stone was laid for the new building of the school at Agenskala Priedes – a district in Pārdaugava, and on 5 December 1931 the new school building was opened (architect – ). On 7 May 1938, the school flag was officially adopted and blessed, and the date was marked as School Flag Day.

=== The time under the Ketija Lakuča regime ===
After the Soviet occupation of Latvia, on 15 September 1940 the name of the school was changed to the Riga Secondary School No. 5. During the German occupation, in 1942 the school got back its former name, yet the premises of the school were used by the military hospital and the lessons had to take place in other locations and were not regular. After the second Soviet occupation of Latvia by the Red Army the German military hospital was liquidated and on 13 November 1944 the school resumed its work as the Riga Secondary School No. 5. In February 1946, the school premises were shared with a children's music school (nowadays – Ketija Lakuča Music School). Since 1956, after its merging with the Primary School No. 46, the school offered education from class 1 to 11. In 1957, the school was named after Zenta Ozola – a graduate of the school of 1941. In 1962, the school started its in-depth specialisation in German. In 1982, for establishing and developing friendly ties between the GDR and the USSR, the school was awarded “The Golden Needle” GDR badge of honour.

=== The time after the restoration of the independent Latvia State ===
After the restoration of independence in 1991, the Riga Secondary School No. 5 named after Zenta Ozola was renamed the Agenskalns Gymnasium. In October 1991, when it celebrated its 70th anniversary, teacher Emīlija Palkavniece returned to the school the historical flag of the Riga State Gymnasium No. 2, which she had secretly kept for 45 years. In 1994, the Āgenskalns Primary School (class 1 to 6) was separated from the Āgenskalns Gymnasium and started its work at 4k-1 Kandavas street. Children from class 7 to 12 continued their education at the Āgenskalns Gymnasium. In 1997, the Āgenskalns Gymnasium became an examination centre for acquiring the German language 2nd degree proficiency diploma (DSD II) in Latvia. On 1 September 2001, a new annex of the school and the sport complex were opened. This project was realized by architect Andrejs Ģelzis – a school graduate of 1972. On 18 May 2004, the School History Museum was opened. Since 2007, the students who have contributed to the prestige of the school are awarded the Owl Prize (“Pūce”) initiated by Jānis Vasariņš – also a graduate of the school. On 1 November 2010, the school regained the status of a state grammar school with the name of the Riga State German Grammar School. In 2013, the school fountain was opened. In 2016, the school celebrated its 95th anniversary since its establishment and the 85th anniversary since the opening of the main school building.

== See also ==
- Education in Latvia
- List of schools in Latvia
