= Čiekurkalns =

Neighbourhood of Riga

Coordinates: 56°59′N 24°10′E

- Neighbourhood of Riga
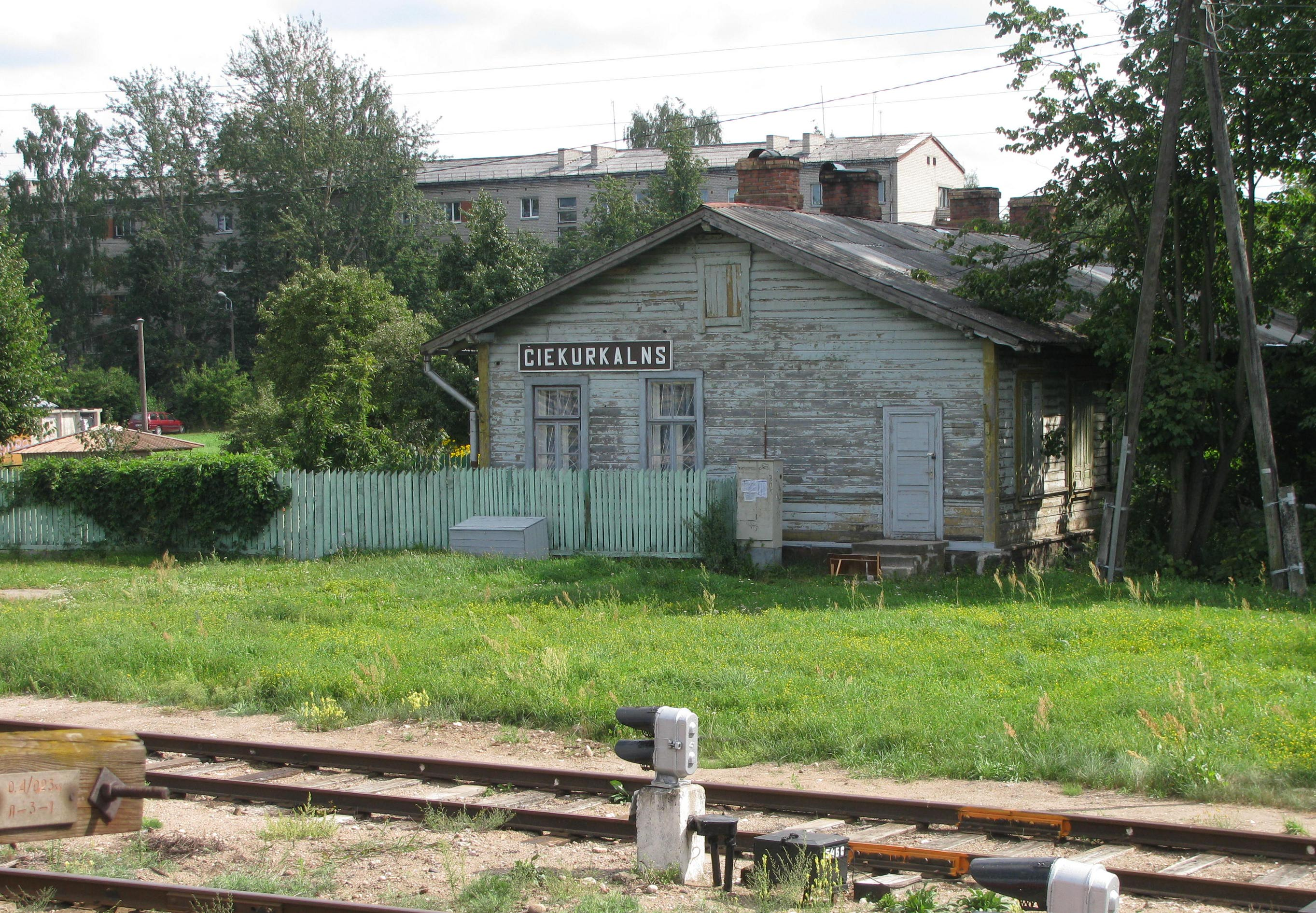
- Čiekurkalns railway station

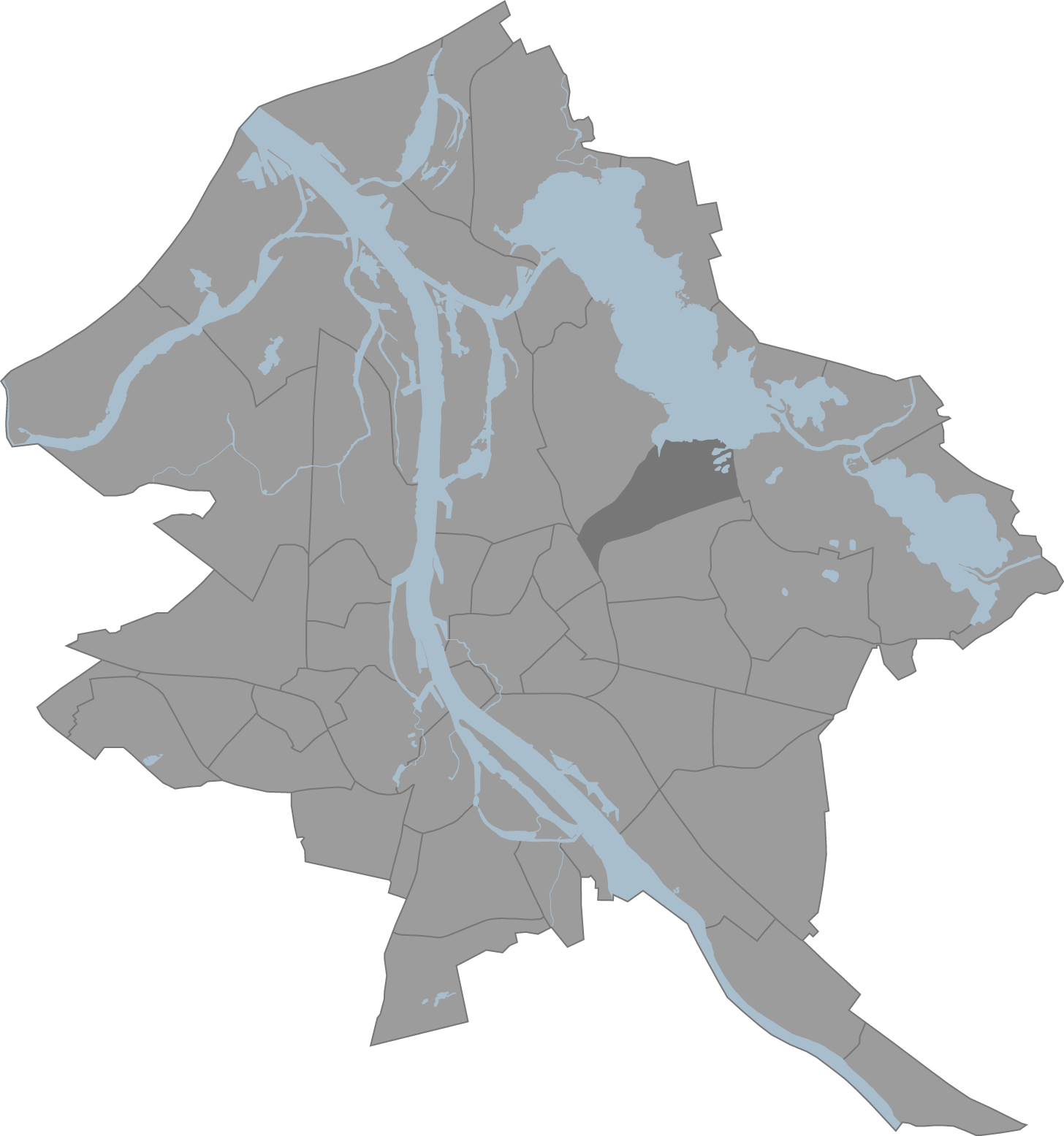
- Location of Čiekurkalns in Riga
- Country: Latvia
- City: Riga
- District: Northern District; Vidzeme Suburb

Area
  - Total: 5.67 km^{2} (2.19 sq mi)

Population (2019)
  - Total: 7,764
  - Density: 1,370/km^{2} (3,550/sq mi)
- Website: apkaimes.lv

Čiekurkalns (German: Schreienbusch) is a neighbourhood of the Northern District of Riga, the capital of Latvia. It is located on the southwestern shore of Lake Ķīšezers.

In April 2014, the new building of the State Revenue Service of Latvia was unveiled at Talejas iela 1 in Čiekurkalns.

The building of the railway station of the same name, which serves the Riga–Lugaži Railway along the southern limits of the neighbourhood, stands in the Teika neighbourhood.
