= RTU Liepāja =

University in Liepāja, Latvia

Coordinates: 56.5087°N 21.0101°E

University of Liepāja
- Liepājas Universitāte
- Former names: Liepāja Pedagogical Institute
- Type: Public
- Established: 1954; 72 years ago
- Rector: Dace Markus
- Academic staff: 25
- Administrative staff: 203
- Students: 1516 (2014)
- Location: 14 Lielā Street, Liepāja, Latvia
- Campus: Urban
- Website: liepu.lv

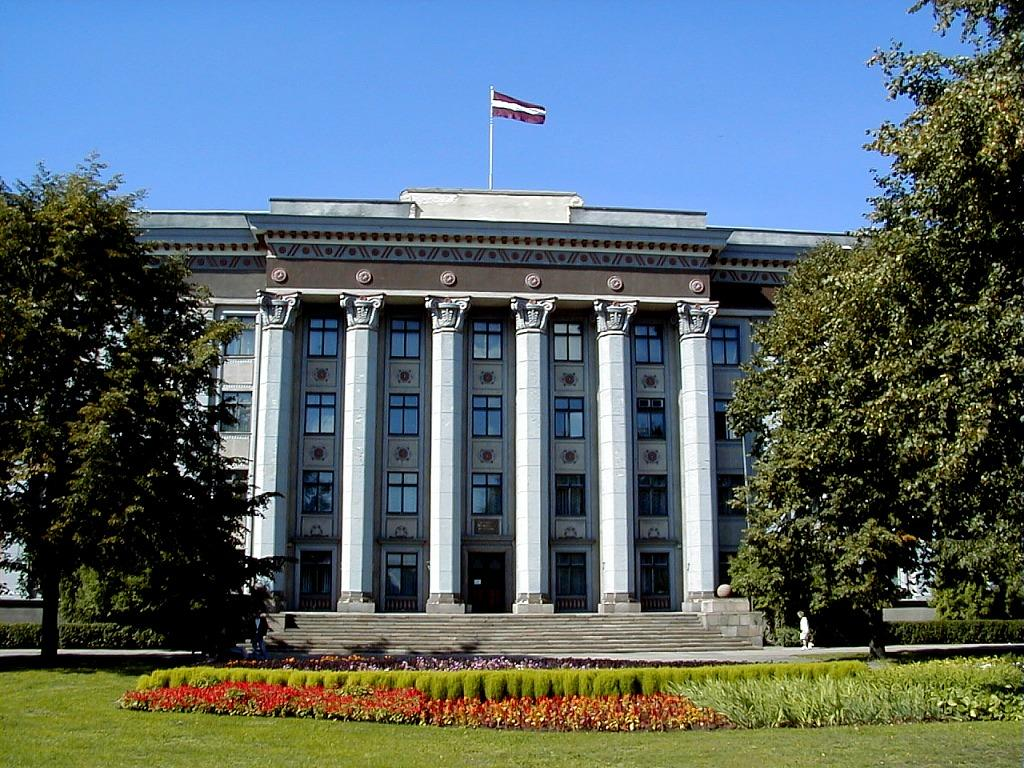
Main building on Lielā Street

University of Liepāja (Latvian: Liepājas Universitāte) is a university in Liepāja, Latvia. The University of Liepāja attained university status on June 12, 2008, following the adoption of the law "On the Constitution of the University of Liepāja" by the Saeima. It holds the distinction of being the newest university in Latvia and the sole university in Kurzeme region. Prior to its university designation, it operated under the name Liepaja Pedagogical Academy, having been known as Liepaja Pedagogical Institute from its founding in 1954 until 1993

== General Information ==
Liepaja University, founded in 1954, is an accredited state higher educational establishment, which implements study programmes at all three study levels: basic studies, Master and Doctorate studies. The number of students is around 2000 divided over around 30 study directions. Liepaja University offers eleven full degree study programs taught in English:

=== Bachelor ===
- Computer science
- Information Technology
- Mechatronics
- Environmental engineering
- Human science

=== Master ===
- Information Technology
- New Media Arts
- Educational Sciences
- Ecotechnologies

=== Doctoral ===
- E-Study Technologies and Management
- Media Art and Creative Technologies (engineering or pedagogical sciences)

Liepaja University is one of the oldest higher educational establishments in the Kurzeme region.

== Organization ==
=== Faculties ===
The University consists of four faculties:

- Faculty of Management and Social Sciences
- Faculty of Science and Engineering
- Faculty of Humanitarian sciences and Arts
- Faculty of Pedagogy and Social work

=== Institutes ===
- Institute of Educational Sciences
- Kurzeme Institute of Humanities
- Institute of Science and Innovative Technologies
- Institute of Management Sciences

== University Merger ==
On March 1, 2024, Liepaja University (LiepU) was set to integrate into Rīga Technical University (RTU), as stipulated in the collaboration agreement endorsed by the Ministry of Education and Science (IZM), Liepāja City Council, LiepU, and RTU on January 29, 2024.

Following integration into RTU, Liepāja University maintains its autonomy. However, the consolidation aims to enhance competitiveness and efficiency while expediting the growth of the university's scientific capabilities. An allocation of EUR 10.8 million is earmarked for the consolidation of the higher education institution, focusing on improving study programs, fostering research, developing new programs, and digitizing the study process.

== See also ==
- List of schools in Latvia
- List of universities and colleges in Latvia
- List of colleges and universities
- List of colleges and universities by country
