= List of schools in Latvia =

This is a list of schools in Latvia.

== Schools in Riga ==
=== State Gymnasiums in Riga ===
- Riga State Gymnasium No.1
- Riga State Gymnasium No.2
- Riga State Gymnasium No.3
- Āgenskalna State Gymnasium
- Riga State Classical Gymnasium
- Riga State German Grammar School

=== Gymnasiums in Riga ===
- Riga English Gymnasium
- Nordic Gymnasium of Riga
- Riga Zolitūde Gymnasium
- Riga German School (Semi-Gymnasium)

=== Lyceums in Riga ===
- Riga French Lycée
- Pushkin Lyceum (Riga)

=== Highschools in Riga ===
- International School of Riga
- Emīls Dārziņš Music School
- Jānis Rozentāls Art High School
- Riga Dome Choir School
- Riga Secondary School No. 13
- International School of Latvia (in Piņķi)

== Schools in Dobele ==
- Dobele State Gymnasium

== Schools in Ogre ==
- Jaunogre Secondary School

== Schools in Saldus ==
Saldus Tehnikums

== Schools in Ventspils ==
- Ventspils Gymnasium No.1

== See also ==
- Education in Latvia
- List of universities in Latvia
