= Mīlgrāvis =

Neighbourhood of Riga, Latvia

Coordinates: 57°02′N 24°06′E

- Neighbourhood of Riga
- Mīlgrāvja iela (Mīlgrāvja Street)

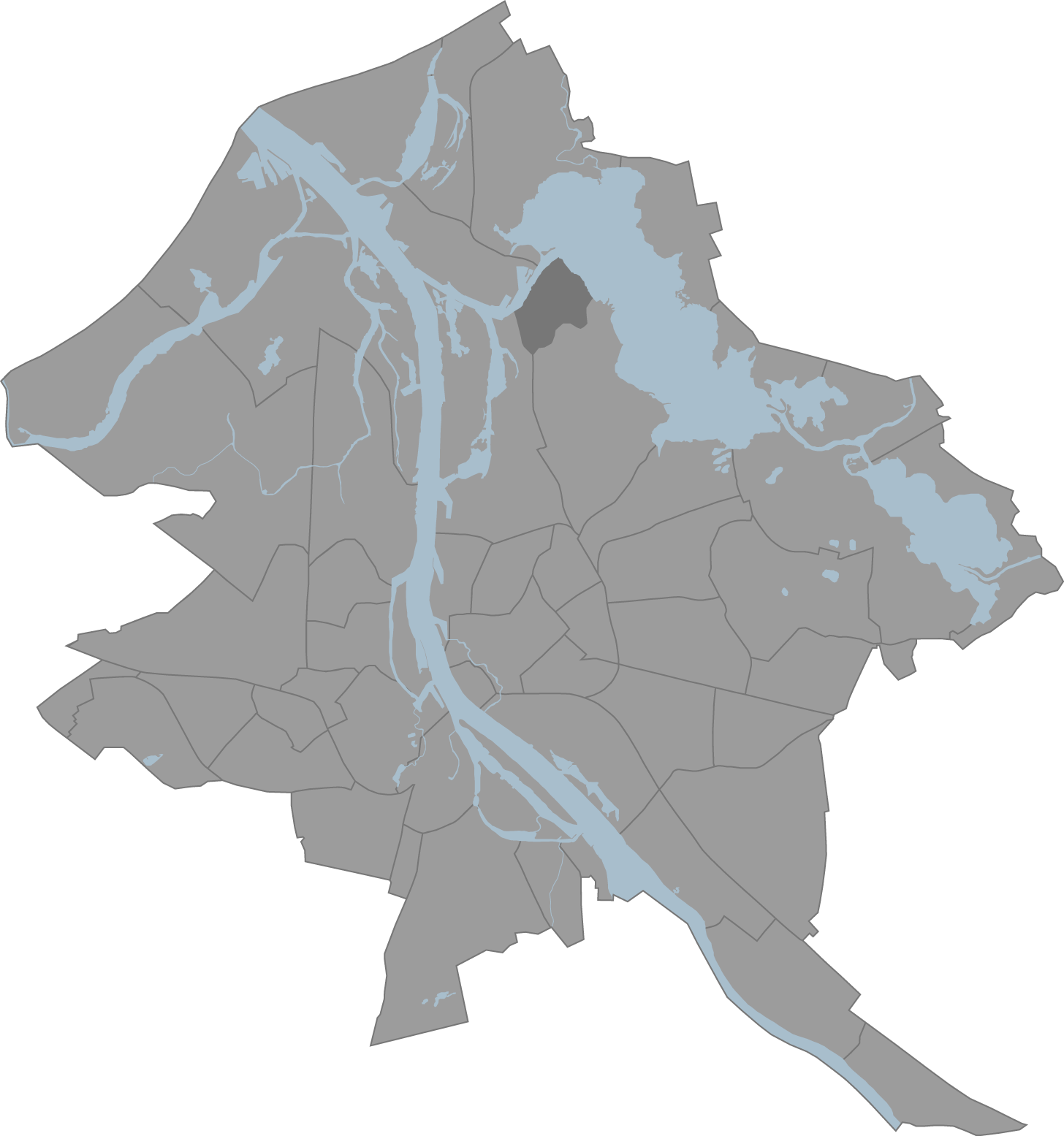
- Location of Mīlgrāvis in Riga
- Country: Latvia
- City: Riga
- District: Northern District

Area
  - Total: 3.225 km^{2} (1.245 sq mi)

Population (2017)
  - Total: 4,104
  - Density: 1,273/km^{2} (3,296/sq mi)
- Postal code: LV-1015
- Website: apkaimes.lv

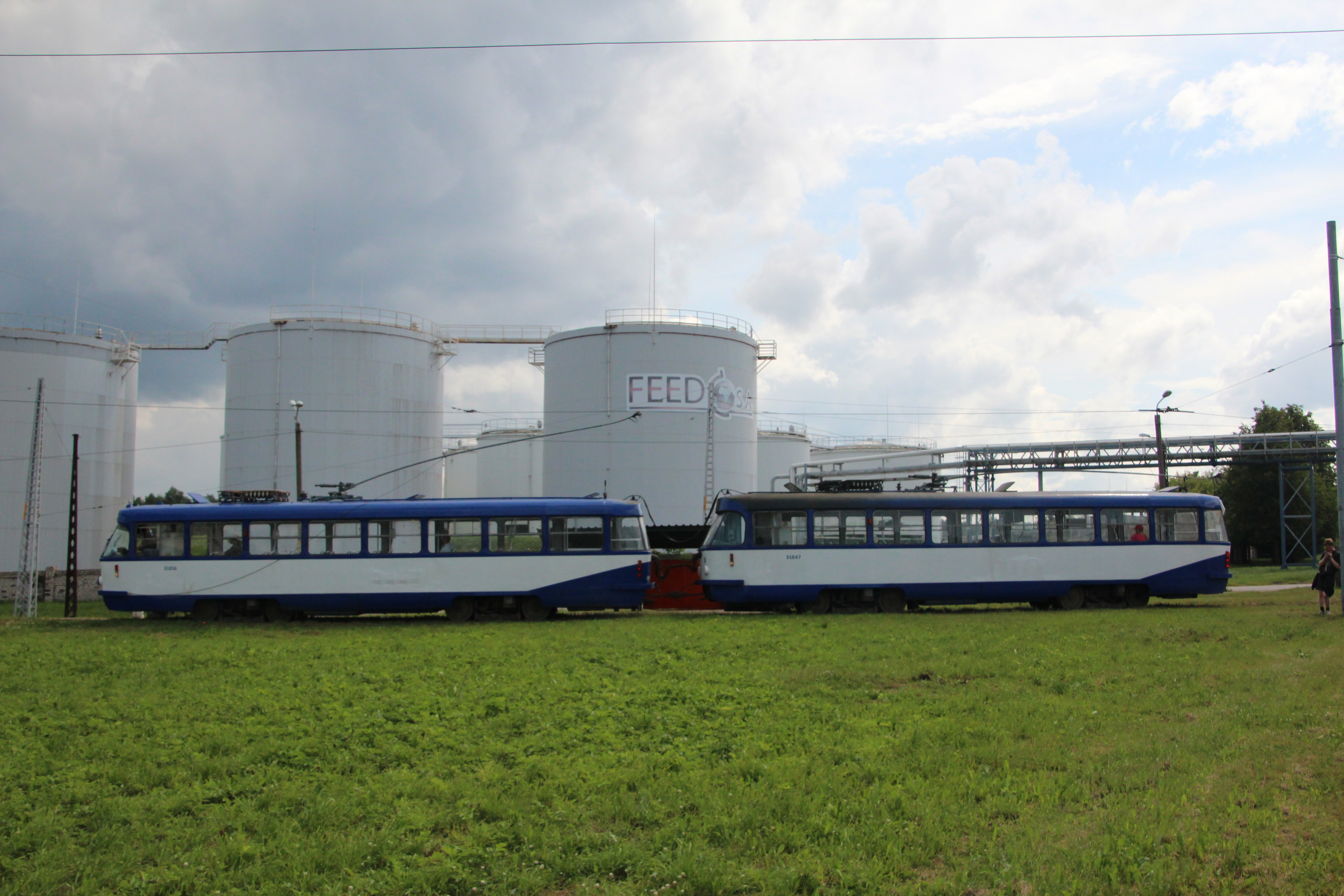
Tram in Mīlgrāvis, made by Margret Linda Kesa (@kesagramm)

Mīlgrāvis is a neighbourhood of Northern District in Riga, the capital of Latvia. It is located on the western shore of Lake Ķīšezers.
