= Jaunciems, Riga =

Neighbourhood of Riga, Latvia

Coordinates: 57°02′30″N 24°10′40″E

Jaunciems
- Neighbourhood of Riga
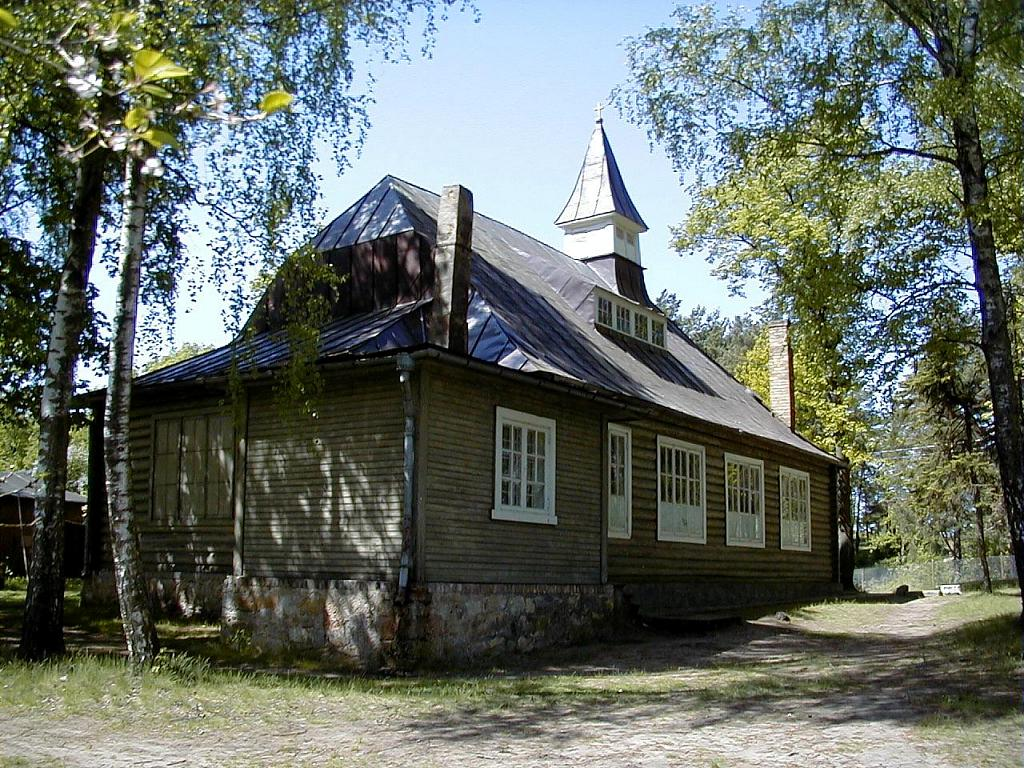
- Evangelical Lutheran Church in Jaunciems

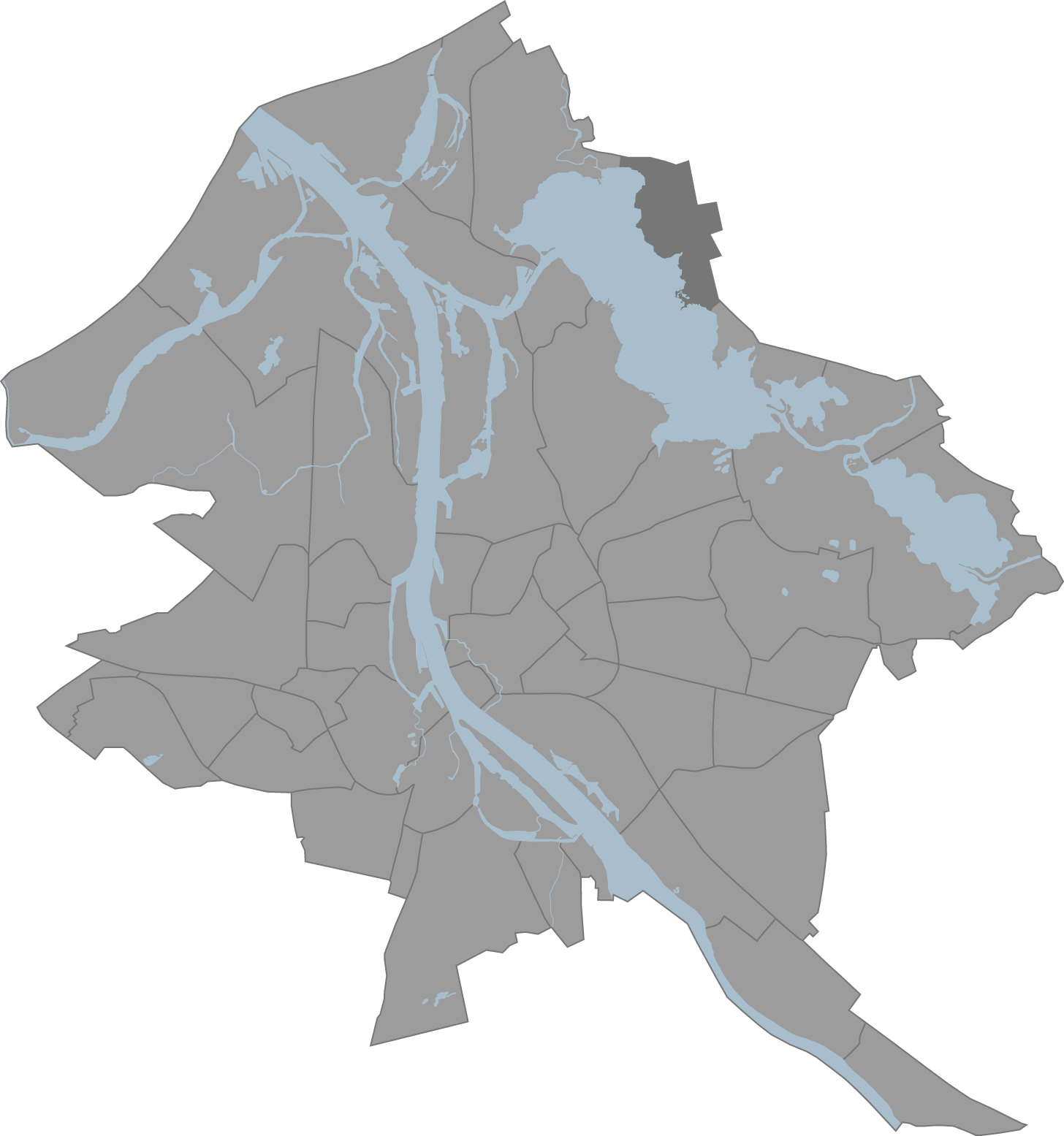
- Location of Jaunciems in Riga
- Country: Latvia
- City: Riga
- District: Northern District

Area
  - Total: 9.132 km^{2} (3.526 sq mi)

Population (2019)
  - Total: 2,339
  - Density: 256.1/km^{2} (663.4/sq mi)
- Website: apkaimes.lv

Jaunciems is a neighborhood of Northern District in Riga, the capital of Latvia. It is located on the northeastern shore of Lake Ķīšezers.
