= Budberg =

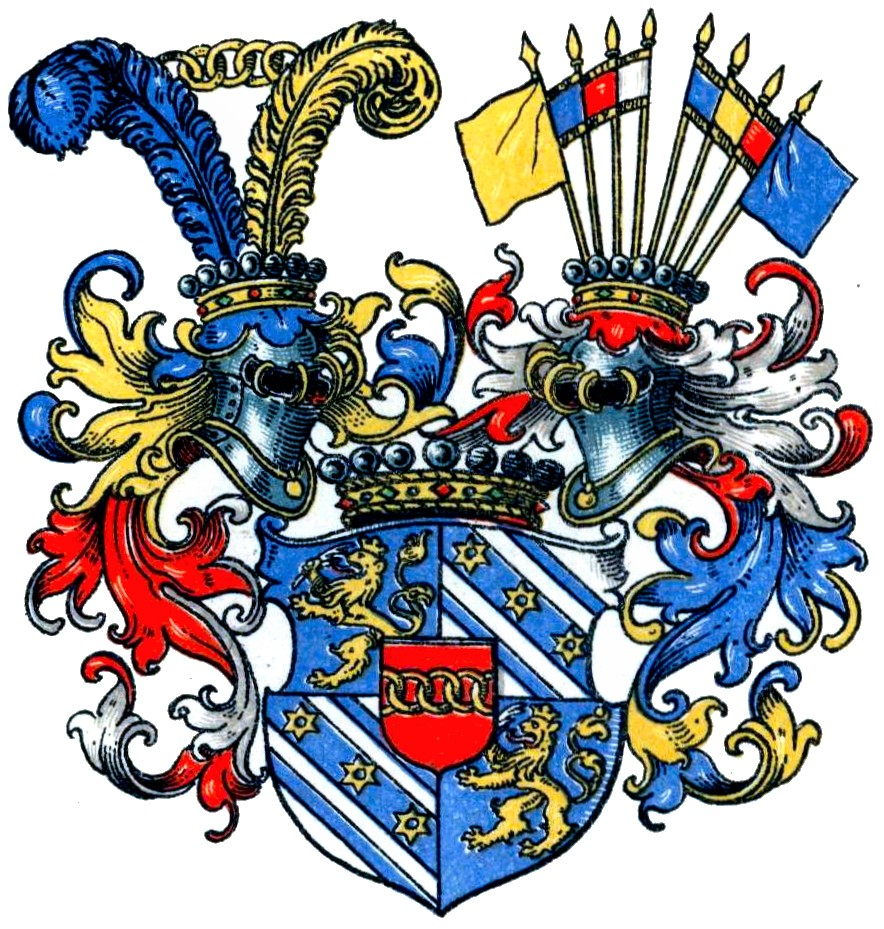
Coat of arms of Barons von Budberg-Bönninghausen

The House of Budberg is a prominent and ancient Baltic German noble family which originated in Westphalia, Germany.

== History ==
According to the archives of Mainz, the first document about the family appeared in 1003, with the name of Cuno von Budberg. One of his noble descendants emigrated to Estonia in the 13th century and established the Baltic-German branch. Members of the family held the title of Baron von Budberg-Bönninghausen in the Russian Empire, Sweden and Prussia.

== Notable members ==
- Andreas Eberhard von Budberg (1750–1812), Russian diplomat
- Karl Ludwig von Budberg (1775–1829), Russian general
- Andrey Fedorovich von Budberg (1817–1881), Russian diplomat
- Moura von Budberg (c. 1891–1974), Russian-British double spy
- Peter Alekseevich von Budberg (1903–1972), Russian-American sinologist

== Sources ==
- "Будберги" . Brockhaus and Efron Encyclopedic Dictionary (in Russian). 1906.
