= Northern District, Riga =

Administrative division of Riga, Latvia

Northern District Ziemeļu rajons Rīgas valstspilsētas Ziemeļu rajons
- District of Riga
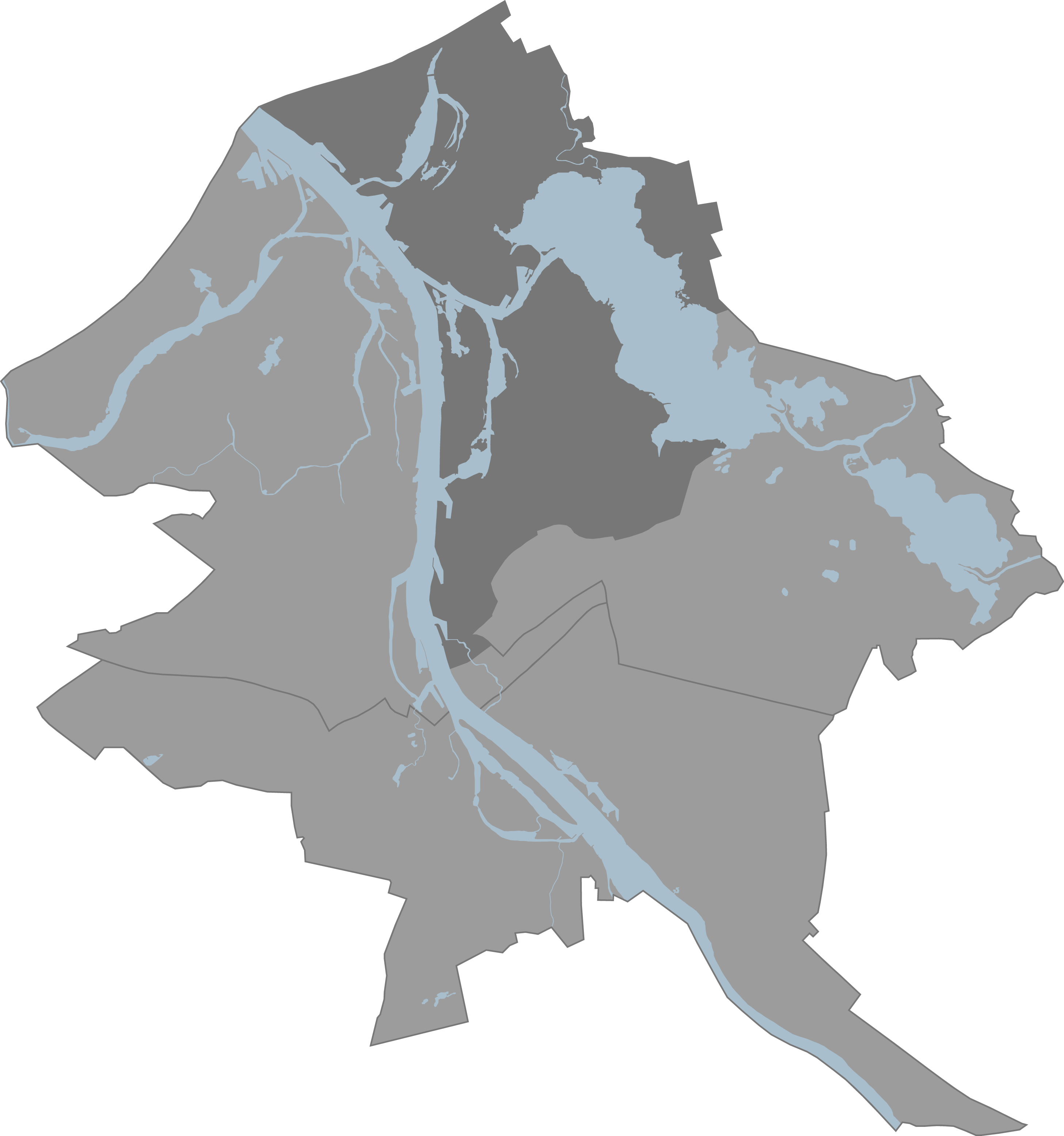
- Location of the Northern District within Riga
- Coordinates: 56°56′56″N 24°6′23″E
- Country: Latvia
- City: Riga

Government
  - Executive Director: Sergejs Hristoļubovs

Area
  - Total: 77 km^{2} (30 sq mi)

Population (2012)
  - Total: 79,030
  - Density: 1,000/km^{2} (2,700/sq mi)

Ethnicity
  - Latvians: 41.17 %
  - Russians: 40.30 %
  - Belarusians: 4.85 %
  - Ukrainians: 4.37 %
  - Poles: 1.99 %
  - Others: 4.02 %
- Time zone: UTC+2 (EET)
  - Summer (DST): UTC+3 (EEST)
- Calling codes: 66 & 67

Northern District (Latvian: Ziemeļu rajons) is one of six administrative districts of Riga, the capital of Latvia. It consists of 11 neighborhoods.

== Administrative divisions ==
The Northern District consists of these neighborhoods of Riga:

- Čiekurkalns (partially in the Vidzeme Suburb)
- Jaunciems
- Kundziņsala
- Mangaļsala
- Mežaparks
- Mīlgrāvis
- Pētersala-Andrejsala
- Sarkandaugava
- Trīsciems
- Vecāķi
- Vecdaugava
- Vecmīlgrāvis

== Education ==
There are 12 secondary education establishments (schools) in the Northern District:

Educational establishment	Main language of studies	Address
Riga State Gymnasium No. 2	Latvian	Krišjāņa Valdemāra iela 1
Riga Secondary School No. 10	Russian	Lenču iela 1
Riga Secondary School No. 13	Russian	Pulkveža Brieža iela 25
Riga Secondary Evening School No. 18	Latvian/Russian	Sīmaņu iela 17
Riga Secondary School No. 28	Latvian	Sliežu iela 23
Riga Secondary School No. 29	Latvian/Russian	Lēdurgas iela 26
Riga Secondary School No. 31	Latvian	Skuju iela 11
Riga Secondary School No. 37	Latvian/Russian	Čiekurkalna 1. līnija 53
Riga Secondary School No. 46	Latvian/Russian	Skuju iela 28
Riga Johann Christoph Brotze Lyceum	Latvian/Russian	Sarkandaugavas iela 22
Riga Special Basic Boarding School	Latvian	Slāvu iela 19, Stokholmas iela 26 (primary school), Baltāsbaznīcas iela 40 (for kids with physical or mental disabilities)
Riga Special Secondary School No. 66	Latvian/Russian	Katrīnas iela 2
Riga Basic School No. 7	Latvian	Jaunciema iela 4. šķ. 4
Jānis Poruks Riga Secondary School	Latvian	Gaujas iela 23, Lībekas iela 27
Riga Cultures Secondary School	Latvian	Ganību dambis 7
Riga Secondary School of Rīnūži	Latvian/Russian	Ziemeļblāzmas iela 59
