= Trīsciems =

Neighborhood of Riga, Latvia

Coordinates: 57°03′N 24°08′E

- Neighbourhood of Riga
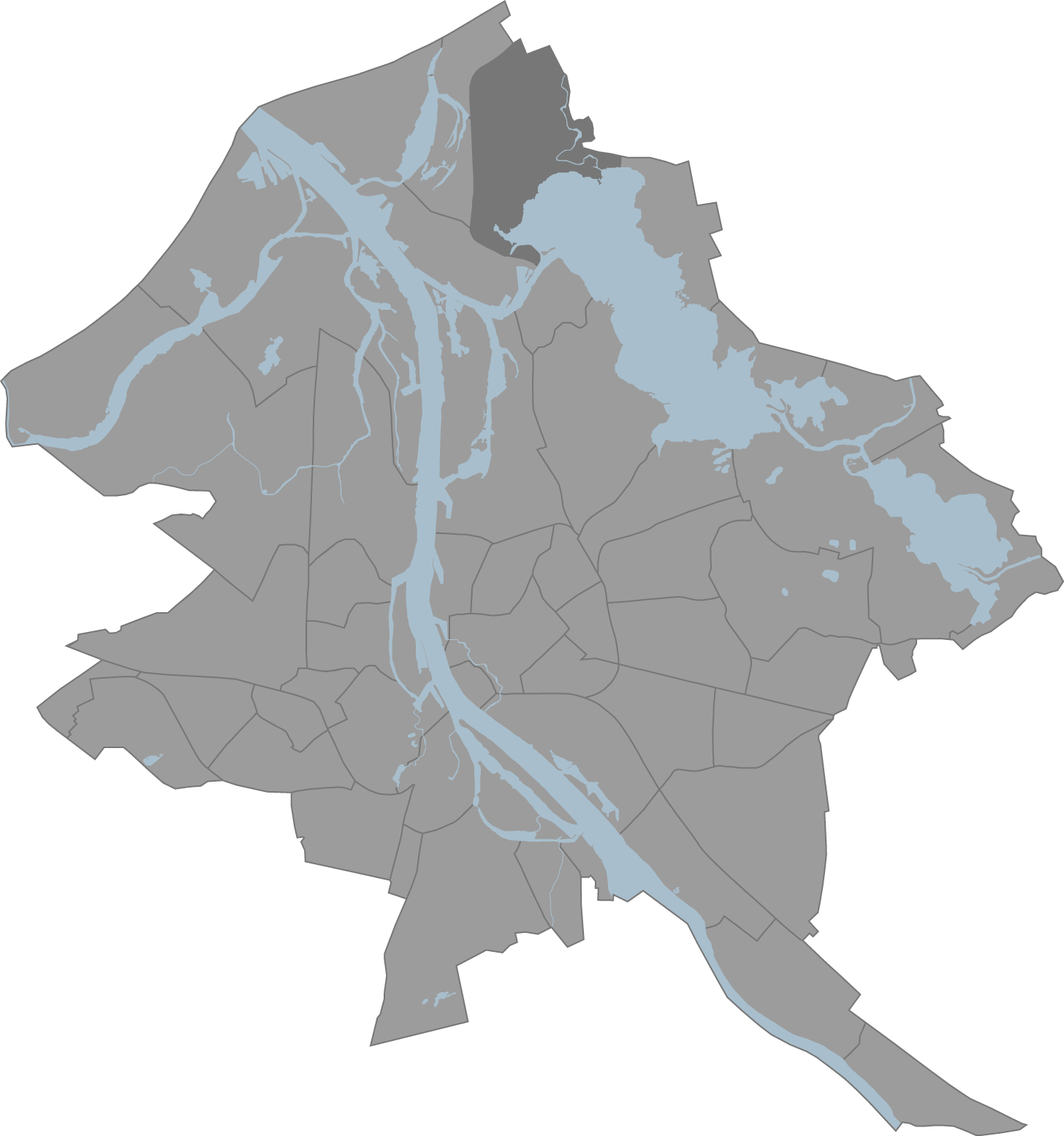
- Location of Trīsciems in Riga
- Country: Latvia
- City: Riga
- District: Northern District

Area
  - Total: 11.319 km^{2} (4.370 sq mi)

Population (2017)
  - Total: 1,161
  - Density: 102.6/km^{2} (265.7/sq mi)
- Website: apkaimes.lv

Trīsciems (loosely translated as 'Three-village') is a neighbourhood of Riga, the capital of Latvia. It's located on the north of the city and is dominated by individual housing.

The total area of Trīsciems neighborhood is 11,319 km^{2}, which is about two times more than the average area of the neighborhoods of Riga.

An area of Trīsciems, where the Langa River flows into Ķīšezers Lake, was the historical location of Mangaļmuiža Manor (German: Magnushof). It is the birthplace of Baltic German diplomat and officer Andreas Eberhard von Budberg.

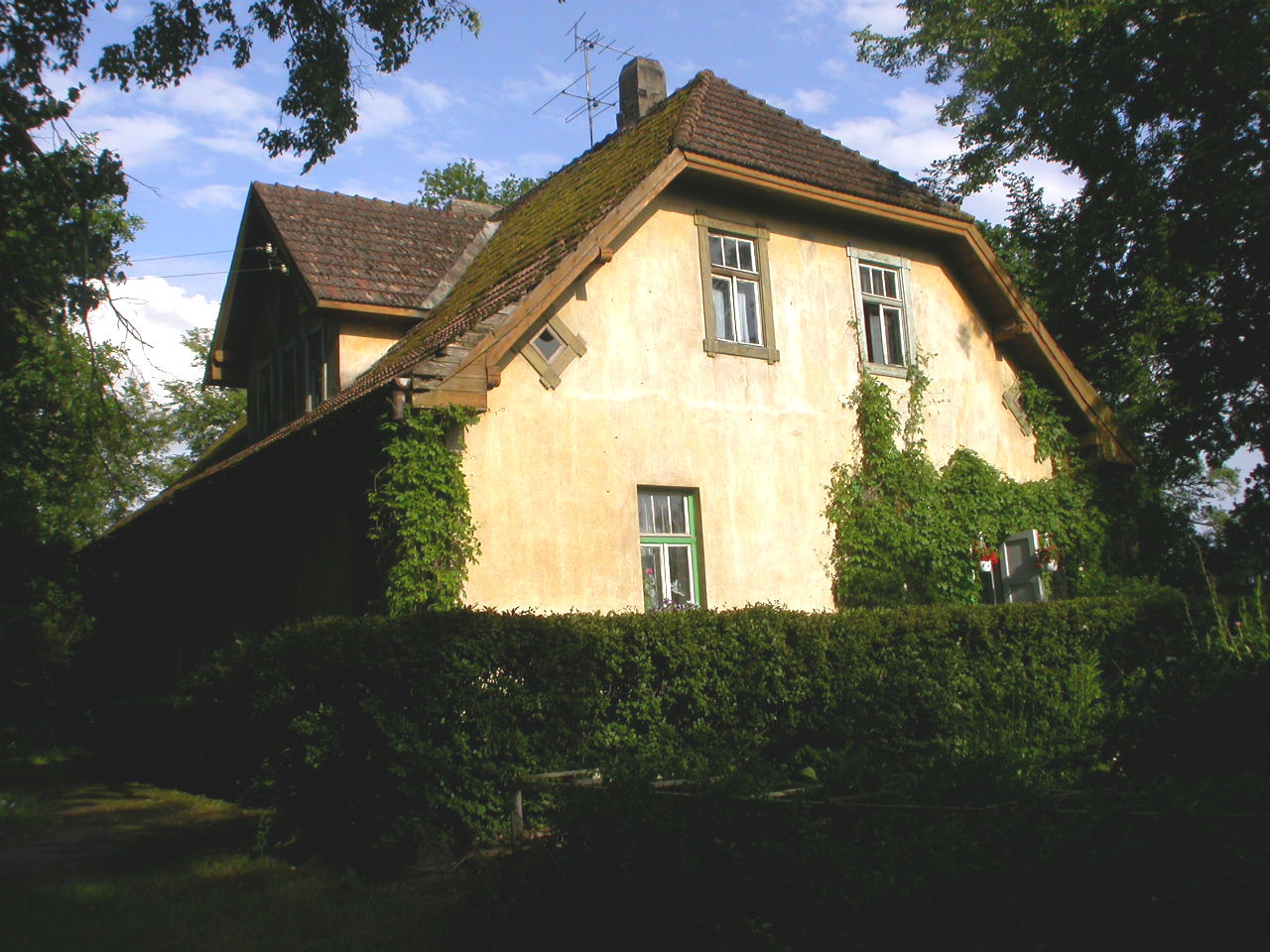
Mangaļi Manor house around 2010
