= Andreas Eberhard von Budberg =

Russian diplomat of Baltic German descent (1750–1812)

Freiherr Andreas Eberhard von Budberg
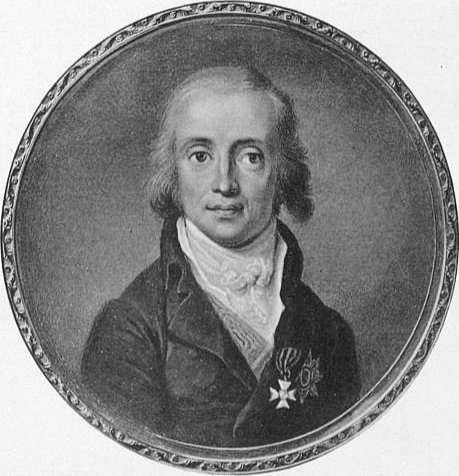
- Portrait, c. 1797–1807

Foreign Minister of the Russian Empire
- In office 1806–1807
- Preceded by: Adam Jerzy Czartoryski
- Succeeded by: Nikolay Rumyantsev

Chairman of the Committee of Ministers
- In office 1806–1807
- Preceded by: Adam Jerzy Czartoryski
- Succeeded by: Nikolay Rumyantsev

Personal details
- Born: 10 August 1750 Magnushof, Mangaļi Parish, Livonian Governorate, Russian Empire
- Died: 1 September 1812 (aged 62) St. Petersburg, Russian Empire

Andreas Eberhard Freiherr von Budberg-Bönninghausen (Russian: Андрей Яковлевич Будберг, romanized: Andrey Yakovlevich Budberg; 10 August 1750 – 1 September 1812) was a Baltic German diplomat who served as the foreign minister of the Russian Empire from 1806 to 1807.

== Biography ==
Born into the Baltic German noble family of Budberg, he was the son of Jacob von Budberg-Bönninghausen (d. 1759) and his wife, Marie Elisabeth von Below (1725–1782). His ancestors moved to Livonia in the 16th century from Westphalia. Budberg was born in Magnushof (now Mangaļmuiža Manor in Trīsciems, Riga) and entered military service in 1759. He participated in the Russo-Turkish War of 1768–1774. In 1783, Budberg was promoted to podpolkovnik. The same year, George Browne, the governor-general of Riga, recommended Budberg to Empress Catherine II as a diplomat. In fact, Budberg had been serving in the army as an infantry officer and had no diplomatic experience. Brown did it because he was a good friend of Budberg's parents.

In 1784, he was appointed a tutor to Catherine's grandson Alexander I and held this position until 1795. In 1793, Budberg was sent to Stockholm to arrange marriage of Catherine's granddaughter Alexandra Pavlovna and young king of Sweden Gustav IV Adolf. Initially consent was given, but later Gustav IV Adolf renounced the betrothal. Two years later Budberg was appointed ambassador in Sweden. In 1799, Catherine II died and Paul I succeeded her. Paul I disliked Budberg and soon he was forced to resign.

In 1804, Alexander I appointed him to the State Council. Budberg was known for his distrust of Napoleon and in 1806, he became Minister of Foreign Affairs. However, in 1807, when the treaties of Tilsit were signed, he resigned and retired from politics.

== Personal life ==
He was married to Anna Helene Charlotte von Meck (1762-1799), daughter of Johann Gotthard von Meck (1731-1779) and his wife, Dorothea Elisabeth von Campenhausen (b. 1741). They had three daughters:

- Baroness Martha von Budberg-Bönninghausen (1783-1787)
- Baroness Katharina von Budberg-Bönninghausen (1785-1842)
- Baroness Helene Julie von Budberg-Bönninghausen (1787-1856); married her cousin, Baron Theodor Otto von Budberg-Bönninghausen (1779–1840). They were parents of:
  - Baron Andrey Fedorovich von Budberg, Russian diplomat

== Sources ==
- "Будберги" . Brockhaus and Efron Encyclopedic Dictionary (in Russian). 1906.

Political offices
Preceded by Adam Jerzy Czartoryski	Minister of Foreign Affairs; 1806–1807	Succeeded by Nikolay Rumyantsev
Preceded by Adam Jerzy Czartoryski (de facto)	Chairman of the Committee of Ministers (de facto); 1806–1807	Succeeded by Nikolay Rumyantsev
