= Pētersala-Andrejsala =

Neighbourhood of Riga, Latvia

Coordinates: 56°58′N 24°05′E

- Neighbourhood of Riga
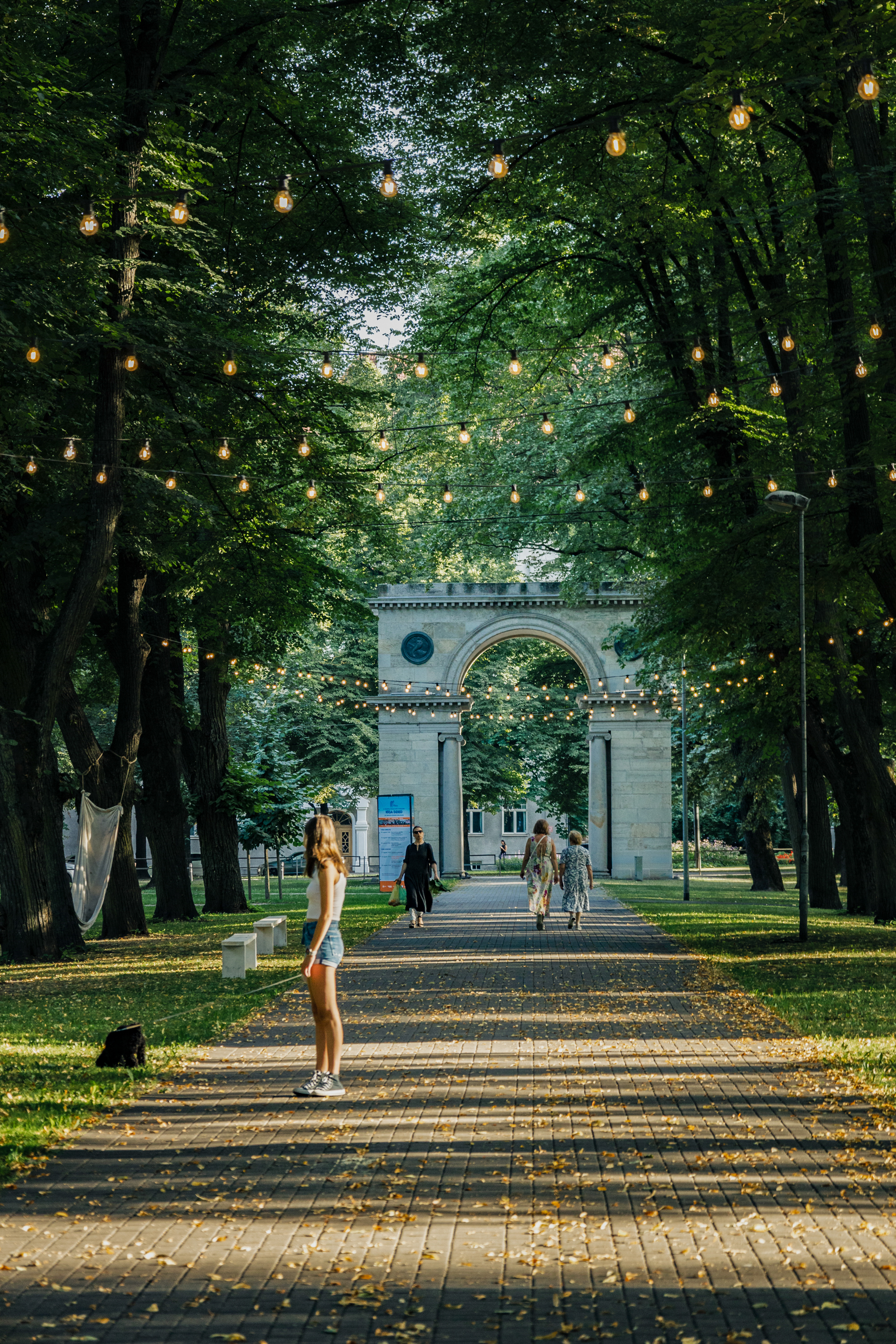
- Viestura dārzs park

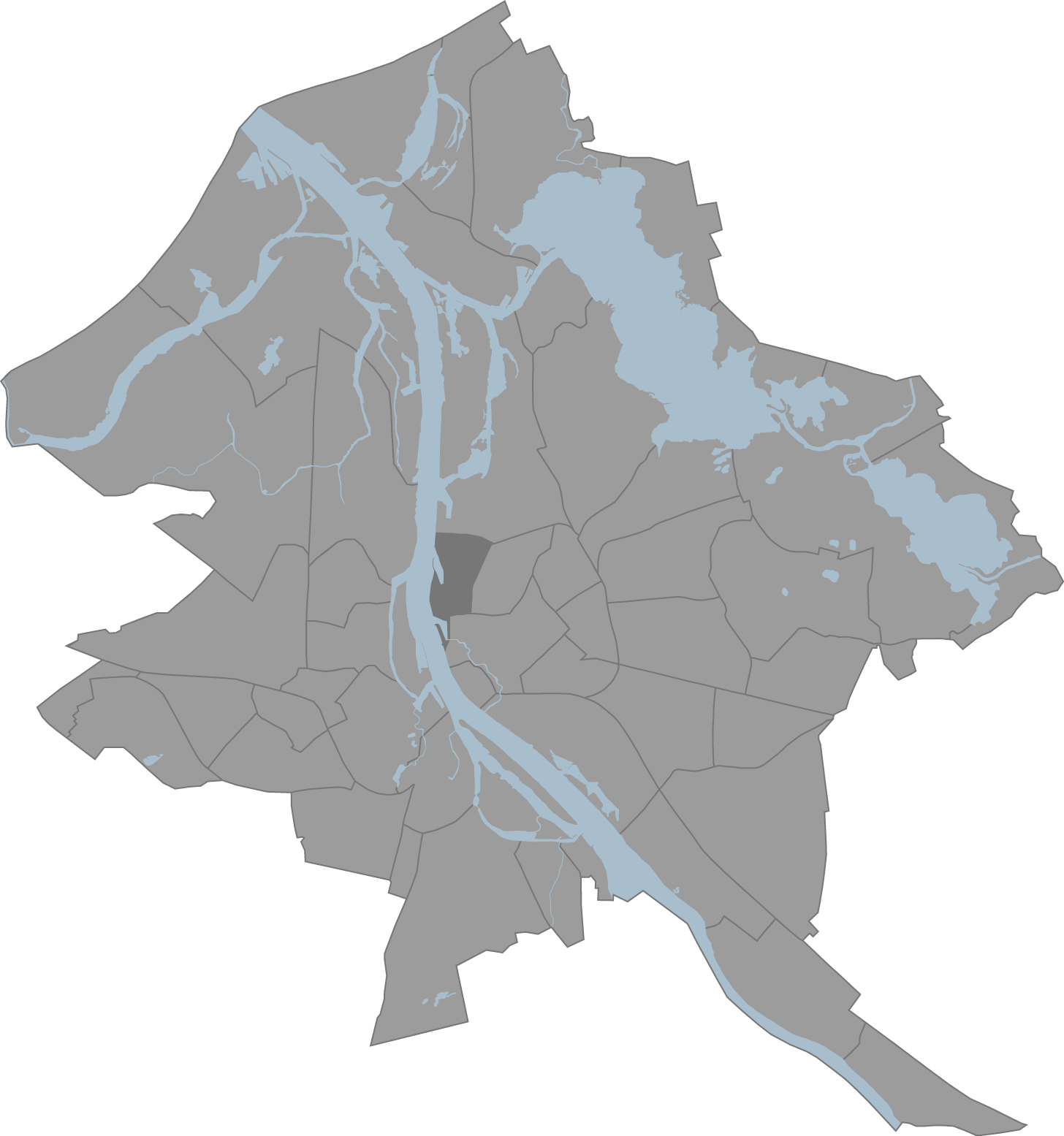
- Location of Pētersala-Andrejsala in Riga
- Country: Latvia
- City: Riga
- District: Northern District

Area
  - Total: 2.773 km^{2} (1.071 sq mi)

Population (2017)
  - Total: 5,581
  - Density: 2,013/km^{2} (5,213/sq mi)
- Postal code: LV-1010
- Website: apkaimes.lv

Pētersala-Andrejsala is a neighbourhood of Riga, the capital of Latvia.

It is located near the Freeport of Riga and consists of the areas of Pētersala and Andrejsala.

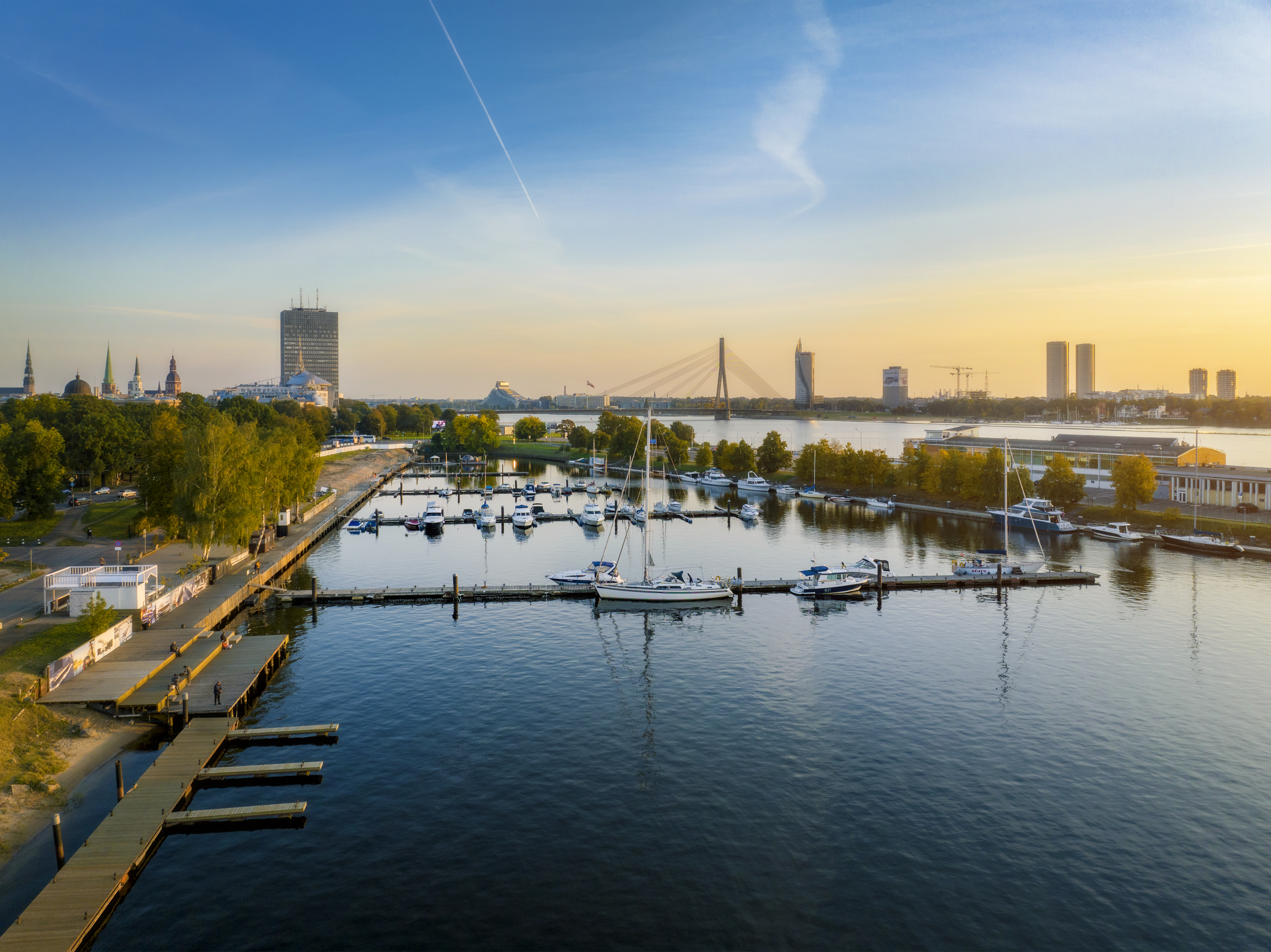
Andrejosta yacht club
