= Andrey Fedorovich Budberg =

Russian diplomat of Baltic German origin (1817–1881)

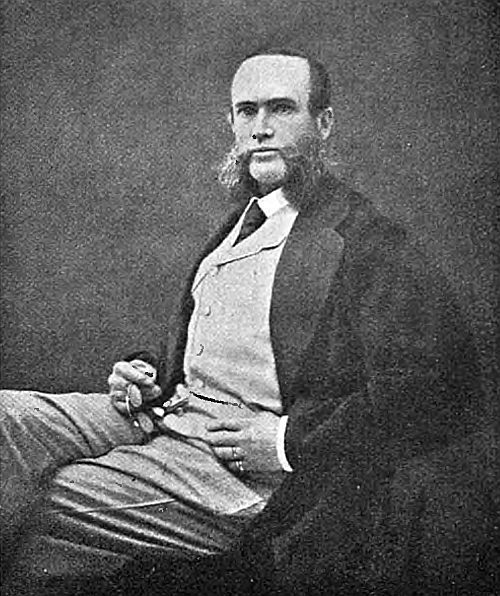
Andrey Fedorovich Budberg

Andreas Ludwig Karl Theodor Freiherr von Budberg-Bönninghausen (Russian: Андрей Фёдорович Будберг; 1 January 1817, Riga – 28 January 1881, St Petersburg) was a Russian diplomat.

== Life ==
His father was Theodor Otto von Budberg-Bönninghausen (1779–1840), a colonel in the Imperial Russian Army and his mother was Baroness Helene Juliane von Budberg (1787–1856; daughter of Foreign Minister Andrei von Budberg), from an old Baltic German family. After attending the cathedral school at Reval, Budberg continued his education at St Petersburg and entered the Russian diplomatic service in 1841.

In 1845, he was joined the Russian embassy at the German Bundestag in Frankfurt, becoming chargé d'affaires there in 1848. In 1850, he played the same role for Prussia in Berlin, being promoted to ambassador in 1851. In 1856, he became the Russian ambassador to the Austrian Empire at Vienna, returning to Berlin between 1858 and 1862. Then he was appointed Russian ambassador to France, a role he fulfilled until 1868.

In 1862, with Budberg's agreement, the French political police arrested in emissaries of Central National Committee, a secret Polish organization, who were returning from London. Just before the January Uprising, the French handed Budberg a list of all conspiring regiments and a description of roads used to smuggle weapons for polish insurgents from abroad.

Whilst in Berlin he lived in the former Amalienpalais, in Unter den Linden.

He was greatly interested in Japan and knew Philipp Franz von Siebold. He was also closely connected with Count Karl Robert von Nesselrode, Grand Duke Konstantin and Baron Wadenstierna.

== Sources ==
- "Будберг, Андрей" . Brockhaus and Efron Encyclopedic Dictionary (in Russian). 1906.
