= Vecāķi =

Neighborhood of Riga, Latvia

Coordinates: 57°04′N 24°06′E

- Neighbourhood of Riga
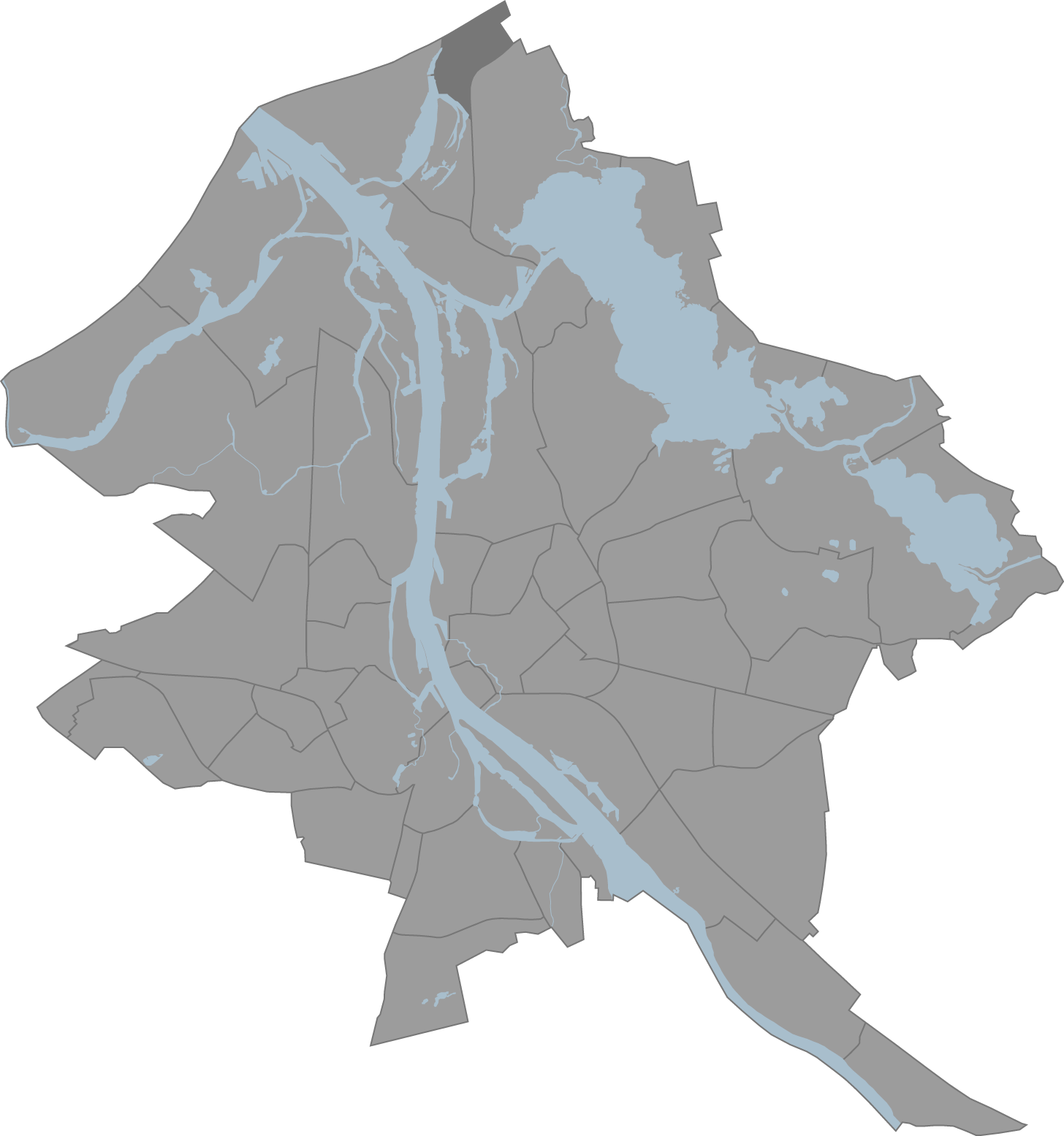
- Location of Vecāķi in Riga
- Country: Latvia
- City: Riga
- District: Northern District

Area
  - Total: 2.303 km^{2} (0.889 sq mi)

Population (2017)
  - Total: 1,765
  - Density: 766.4/km^{2} (1,985/sq mi)
- Postal code: LV-1030
- Website: apkaimes.lv

Vecāķi (Latvian pronunciation: [ˈvætsaːci]) is a Northern District neighbourhood in Riga, the capital of Latvia. It is one of Riga's neighborhoods lying on the shores of Gulf of Riga, Baltic Sea. Westward Vecāķi is bordered by Vecdaugava – a partial oxbow lake (a dead-end fork of River Daugava that hasn't been cut off from it completely.) Thus Vecāķi offers both freshwater and brackish water bathing places, with the former having a higher water temperature come summer due to the smaller volume of Vecdaugava.

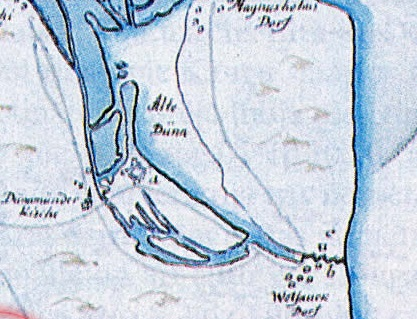
1701 map showing the village of “Wetsanck Dorf”

German names for the town include Bad Magnushof, Wezaken, and Wetsanck Dorf.

== Etymology ==
The name may be a compound of vecs and āķis pluralized to mean "Old Hook." Vecs being a native Baltic word and āķis ultimately a borrowing from either Middle Low German hake or Middle Dutch haeck.

Dzintra Hirša notes that connecting the name with fishing hooks is a folk etymology and that the name is derived from an alternate sense of āķis from a similar alternative sense of its ultimate source – the Low German hake – "cape; shoal, sandbank."
