= Education in Latvia =

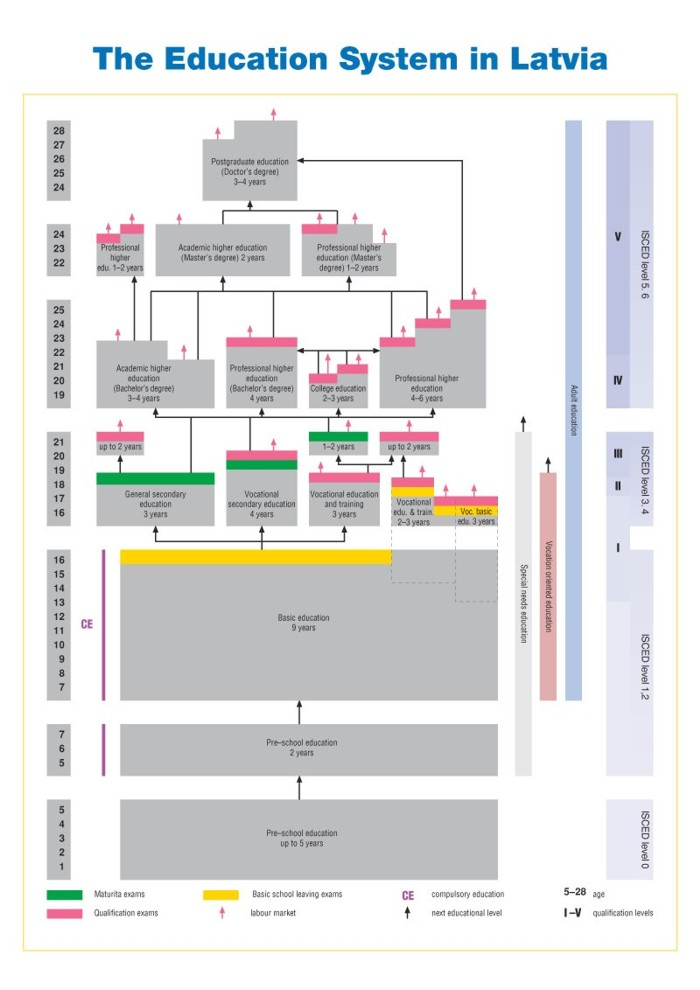
The education system in Latvia

Education in Latvia is free and compulsory. Compulsory education includes two years of preschool education (usually starting at five years old) and a further nine years of primary education (usually until 15/16 years of age).

== History ==
In 1996, the gross primary enrollment rate was 95.8 percent, while the net primary enrollment rate was 89.5 percent. The number of children who do not attend primary school was increasing as of 2001. In rural areas, a number of schools have been closed. The place allocated to minority languages in secondary education after the 2004 minority school transfer to bilingual education (60% in Latvian and 40% in the minority language) was an issue of protests in 2003–2004 and was opposed by Headquarters for the Protection of Russian Schools and Association in Support of Russian Language Schools.

According to 2010 data from UNESCO, 4,720 students from Latvia were enrolled in tertiary education abroad (mostly in the UK, Russia and Germany); 1,760 students from other countries were enrolled in tertiary education in Latvia (mostly from Russia, Ukraine and Lithuania).

In 2024, National defense became a compulsory subject in high school.

== See also ==
- Human rights in Latvia
- List of schools in Latvia
- List of universities in Latvia
- Academic grading in Latvia
