= List of universities and colleges in Latvia =

This is a list of universities and colleges in Latvia. The accrediting body for universities and colleges in Latvia is the 'Council of Higher Education' (Augstākās izglītības padome).

Institutions are divided into 'first-level vocational schools or colleges' (pirmā līmeņa profesionālās izglītības iestādes jeb koledžas) and Augstskola, a Latvian language term roughly translated as 'high school' or 'higher school', which covers institutions generally referred to as universities or tertiary colleges in English. Each category is further subdivided as follows:

== Universities ==
=== State universities (Valsts universitātes) ===
- University of Daugavpils
- Latvia University of Life Sciences and Technologies
- Riga Stradiņš University
- Riga Technical University
- University of Latvia
- University of Liepāja

=== State colleges (Valsts augstskolas) ===
- Latvian Academy of Art
- BA School of Business and Finance (formerly the Banking College under the Bank of Latvia)
- Jāzeps Vītols Latvian Academy of Music (formerly the Latvian Conservatory)
- Latvian Academy of Culture (lv)
- Latvian Academy of Sport Education (merged into Riga Stradiņš University in 2023)
- Latvian Maritime Academy (merged into Riga Technical University in 2022)
- National Defence Academy of Latvia
- Rēzekne Academy of Technology
- Riga Teacher Training and Educational Management Academy (lv) (merged into University of Latvia from 2017)
- Ventspils University of Applied Sciences
- Vidzeme University of Applied Sciences

=== Non-university type colleges (Neuniversitātes tipa augstskolas) ===
- Baltic International Academy (including the Baltic Psychology and Management College)
- College of Economics and Culture (lv)
- International School of Practical Psychology (lv)
- ISMA University
- Latvian Christian Academy (lv)
- Luther Academy (lv)
- Riga Aeronautical Institute (lv)
- Riga Graduate School of Law (RGSL)
- University of Business, Arts and Technology (formerly Riga International School of Economics and Business Administration)
- School of Social Technologies
- Stockholm School of Economics in Riga
- Transport and Telecommunication Institute
- Turība University

== Vocational schools and colleges ==
=== State colleges (Valsts koledžas) ===
- Daugavpils Medical College (lv) (integrated into the University of Daugavpils from March 2018)
- Fire Safety and Civil Defence College
- Jēkabpils Agribusiness College
- Latvian Cultural College at the Latvian Academy of Culture
- Liepāja Maritime College
- Malnava College (lv)
- Olaine Mechanics and Technology College
- Red Cross Medical College at Riga Stradiņš University (lv)
- Riga 1st Medical College (lv)
- Riga Building College
- Riga Business College at the BA School of Business and Finance
- Riga Medical College at the University of Latvia (lv)
- Riga Technical College (lv)
- State Agency for Social Integration College
- State Border Guard College
- State Police College (lv)
- Stradiņš Medical College at the University of Latvia (lv)
- European Skill Training Institute

=== Colleges established with legal personality (Juridisko personu dibinātās koledžas) ===
- Albert College
- Christian Leadership College
- College of Accounting and Finance
- College of Business Administration (lv)
- College of Law
- Cosmetology College
- Latvian College of Business (lv)
- Novikontas Maritime College

=== Foreign university affiliates (Ārvalstu augstskolu filiāles) ===
- Newport University CED, Latvia, affiliated with the Tomsk State University
- Riga Higher Institute of Religious Sciences, under the Pontifical Lateran University
- Riga Institute of Theology, under the Pontifical Lateran University

== See also ==
- List of colleges and universities
- List of colleges and universities by country
- List of schools in Latvia
- List of universities in Estonia
- List of universities in Lithuania
