= Moura Budberg =

Russian adventuress (1892–1974)

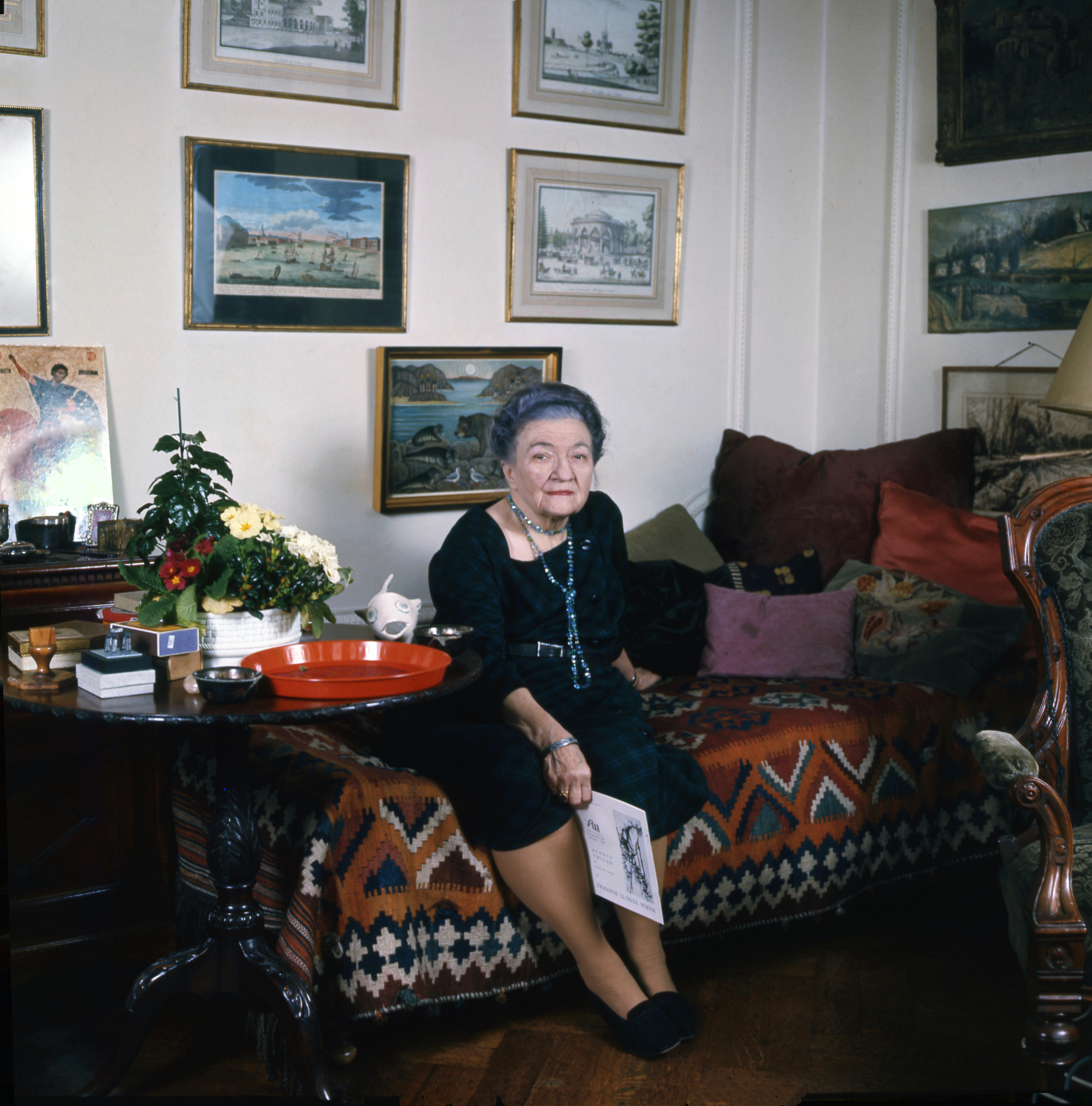
- Budberg in 1972, by Allan Warren
- Born: Maria Ignatievna Zakrevskaya (Мария Игнатьевна Закревская); February 1892; Poltava, Russian Empire
- Died: 1 November 1974 (aged 82); Terranuova Bracciolini, Italy
- Occupations: Secretary; screenwriter
- Spouses: Ivan Alexandrovich, Count von Benckendorff (m. 1911; died 1919) Nikolai, Baron von Budberg-Bönninghausen (m. 1921, divorced)
- Partner(s): R. H. Bruce Lockhart; Maxim Gorky; H. G. Wells
- Children: 2
- Father: Ignaty Platonovich Zakrevsky

Maria (Moura) Ignatievna von Budberg-Bönninghausen (Russian: Мария (Мура) Игнатьевна Закревская-Бенкендорф-Будберг, romanized: Mariya (Mura) Ignatyevna Zakrevskaya-Benkendorff-Budberg; née Zakrevskaya; 6 March 1893 – 1 November 1974), also known as Countess von Benckendorff and Baroness von Budberg, was a Russian translator and suspected double agent of the Soviet Union's Joint State Political Directorate (OGPU) and British intelligence agencies.

According to the British journalist Robin Bruce Lockhart, "she was, perhaps, the Soviet Union's most effective agent-of-influence ever to appear on London's political and intellectual stage".

== Biography ==
=== Early life ===
Born in Poltava in Poltava Governorate of the Russian Empire (present-day Ukraine), Moura was the daughter of Ignaty Platonovich Zakrevsky (1839–1906), a member of the Russian nobility and diplomat. In 1911, she married Johann (Ivan) Alexandrovich von Benckendorff (1882–1919), a member of the Baltic German nobility, Second Secretary at the Russian embassy in Berlin, and Gentleman of the Court. They had two children: Paul (1913–1998) and Tatiana (1915–2004), who later married Bernard Alexander and became the mother of the businesswoman Helen Alexander. Benckendorff owned a large country house and estate in Estonia, the Jäneda (Jendel) manor. On 19 April 1919, he was discovered dead in his estate. The identities of the murderers were never found, but it is possible he was killed by local peasants who sought to divide the land of an aristocratic family.

=== Arrests ===
Before the October Revolution, Moura worked in the English embassy in Petersbourg, where she became acquainted with British diplomat R. H. Bruce Lockhart. Upon the assassination of her husband in 1919, she was arrested on suspicion of spying for the United Kingdom and was transferred to the Lubyanka prison. Lockhart, who mentioned her under her given name in his 1932 book Memoirs of a British Agent, tried to vouch for her but was detained as well for a couple of weeks. They had been lovers and she became pregnant by him, but the pregnancy miscarried. Lockhart's book was made into an American movie in 1934, British Agent, starring Leslie Howard as "Stephen Locke" and Kay Francis as "Elena Moura".

Before Lockhart's release and expulsion from Russia, in connection with the "Lockhart Plot", Budberg was also released, under the condition that she would co-operate with the intelligence service if the need ever arose. After two more arrests and detentions in Petersburg, Budberg began to work for and publish in the review "World Literature", where she had met its director, the writer Maxim Gorky through Korney Chukovsky. She became the secretary and common-law wife of Gorky, living in his house with a few interruptions from 1920 to 1933 when the writer lived in Italy, before returning to the Soviet Union. He dedicated his last major work, the novel The Life of Klim Samgin, to her.

=== H. G. Wells ===
In 1920, Budberg, still known as Mrs. Benckendorff, met British author H. G. Wells when he made a celebrated visit to Moscow, and they had a one-night stand. She was briefly married, on 13 November 1921, to Baron Nikolai (Rotger Emil Arthur Friedrich) von Budberg-Bönningshausen (born 1896). It was a marriage of convenience, and they soon divorced. It provided her with a title and a passport, however, and thus an ability to leave Soviet Union to visit both her children in Estonia, and Gorky, who then lived near Sorrento. Baron Budberg, a shady character, eventually moved for good to Brazil. Moura's relationship with Wells was renewed in 1929 in Berlin and then in 1933 in London, where she had emigrated after Gorky moved back tò the Soviet Union. The close relationship continued until Wells's death in 1946. He had asked her to marry him, but Budberg constantly rejected the proposal.

=== Double agent suspicion ===
Budberg was widely suspected of being a double agent for both the Soviet Union and British intelligence agencies. She is known to have visited the Soviet Union several times after the 1920s: first overtly in 1936 for the funeral of Gorky (which made people call her an agent of the NKVD), and again at the end of 1950, with a daughter of Alexander Guchkov, in 1958, 1961, 1962, 1963, 1965, 1968 and in 1973, the year before she died.

After becoming a British citizen in 1947, still under investigation, an MI5 informant said of her, "she can drink an amazing quantity, mostly gin".

=== Writing career ===
Among many other activities, Budberg wrote books and was the script writer for at least two films: Three Sisters (1970), directed by Laurence Olivier and John Sichel, and The Sea Gull (1968), directed by Sidney Lumet. She translated Gorky's novel The Life of a Useless Man (1908) into English in 1971.

Moura Budberg maintained residences in London at Ennismore Gardens and in Cromwell Road. She had made her permanent home in England from the time she emigrated there in 1929 until shortly before her death (31 October 1974), when she returned to Italy.

== Family ==
Budberg's older sister, Alexandra "Alla" Ignat'evna Zakrevskaya (1887–1960), who had married Baron Arthur von Engelhardt (1875–1909) in 1908 under cover, being pregnant of a married man, divorced in 1909 and left her daughter Kira tò be brought up by her sister Moura and their old nanny, Margaret Wilson. Kira (1909–2005) married a medical doctor in the United Kingdom and was grandmother of Nick Clegg, the leader of the Liberal Democrats political party between December 2007 and May 2015, and Deputy Prime Minister of the United Kingdom from 2010 to 2015.

== Legacy ==
In May 2008, a television film called My Secret Agent Auntie, directed by Dimitri Collingridge, was released in England. Her biography was written by Nina Berberova, who chronicled the émigrés.

== Sources ==
- Commire, Anne, ed. (1999). "Budberg, Moura". Women in World History: Brem-Cold. Yorkin Publications. pp. 177–180. ISBN 978-0-7876-4062-0.
