= Karl Ludwig von Budberg =

Russian lieutenant general (1775–1829)

Baron Karl Vasilievich Ludwig von Budberg-Bönninghausen
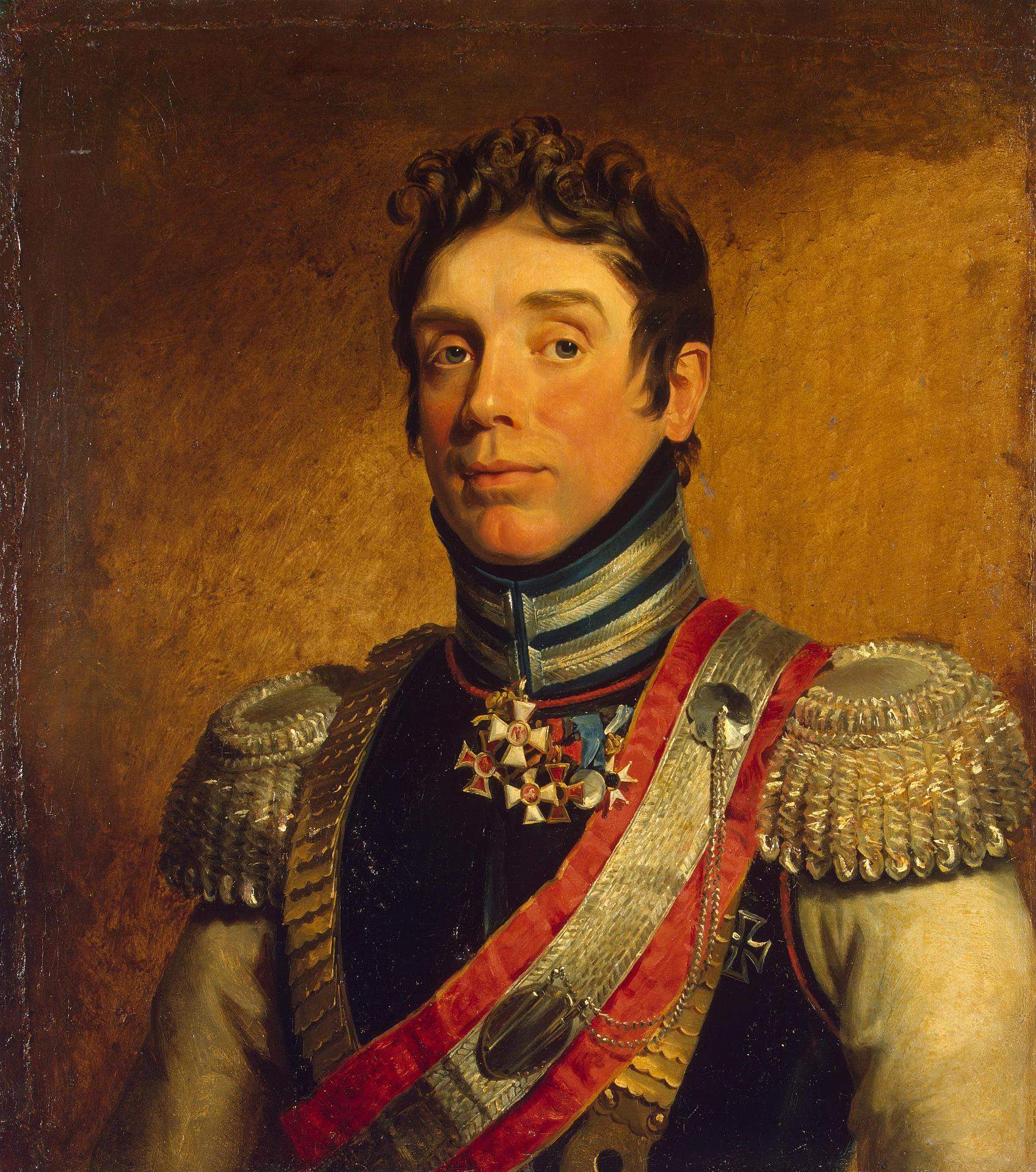
- Portrait by George Dawe, Military Gallery of the Winter Palace, 1823–1825.
- Born: 9 July 1775; Governorate of Livonia
- Died: 8 September 1829 (aged 54) Turkey
- Allegiance: Russia
- Branch: Imperial Russian Army
- Service years: 1786–1829
- Rank: Lieutenant general
- Commands: His Majesty's Life-Guards Cuirassier Regiment; 2nd Brigade of the 1st Cuirassier Division; 2nd Hussar Division
- Conflicts: War of the Second Coalition; Swiss Expedition; Helder Expedition; War of the Fourth Coalition; Battle of Eylau; Battle of Guttstadt-Deppen; Battle of Heilsberg; Battle of Friedland; French invasion of Russia; Battle of Vitebsk; Battle of Smolensk; Battle of Vyazma; Battle of Borodino; War of the Sixth Coalition; Battle of Lützen; Battle of Bautzen; Battle of Kulm; Battle of Leipzig; Russo-Turkish War (1828–29); Battle of Kulevicha
- Awards: Order of St. George; Order of the Red Eagle; Order of St. Vladimir; Order of Saint Anna; Order of Saint Alexander Nevsky; Order of Leopold (Austria); Military Order of Max Joseph; Kulm Cross; Gold Sword for Bravery

Baron Karl Vasilievich Ludwig von Budberg-Bönninghausen (Russian: Карл Васильевич Будберг 9 July 1775 – 8 September 1829) was an Imperial Russian cavalry general and nobleman who participated in the Napoleonic Wars.

== Early life ==
By birth member of the House of Budberg, a German Baltic noble family, Ludwig was born in the Governorate of Livonia, as the son of Baron Ludwig Otto von Budberg-Bönninghausen (1729–1797) and his wife, Baroness Elisabeth Sophie von Löwenstern (1748–1811).

== Biography ==
Budberg first joined the military at the age of eleven. He participated in the Italian and Swiss expedition and the Anglo-Russian invasion of Holland in 1799 and was promoted to lieutenant colonel by 1801.

During the War of the Fourth Coalition, Budberg fought in the battles of Guttstadt-Deppen, Heilsberg, Friedland, and Eylau, at which he was wounded in the arm.

In 1811, he was made chief of His Majesty's Life-Guards Cuirassier Regiment, and maintained this command through the French invasion of Russia and the subsequent War of the Sixth Coalition, where he distinguished himself in numerous battles, including Borodino, Kulm, and Leipzig. He was promoted to major general in 1813.

In 1816, Budberg was made commander of the 2nd Brigade of the 1st Cuirassier Division and then commander of the 2nd Hussar Division in 1824. In 1826 he was promoted to lieutenant general and then fought in the Russo-Turkish War of 1828, during which he died of a sudden illness.

== Personal life ==
He was married to Caroline Charlotte Jacobine Berens von Rautenfeld (1779–1839), daughter of Johann Georg Berens von Rautenfeld (1741–1805) and his wife, Elisabeth Charlotte von der Wenge genannt Lambsdorff (1749–1782). They had two daughters:

- Baroness Eveline Anna Elisabeth von Budberg-Bönninghausen (1803–1878); married to Matthias Dietrich von der Recke (1791–1869) and had issue
- Baroness Henrietta von Budberg-Bönninghausen (d. 1847)

== See also ==
- List of Russian commanders in the Patriotic War of 1812
- Baltic Germans
