= Andrejsala =

Area in Riga, Latvia

Coordinates: 56°58′N 24°06′E

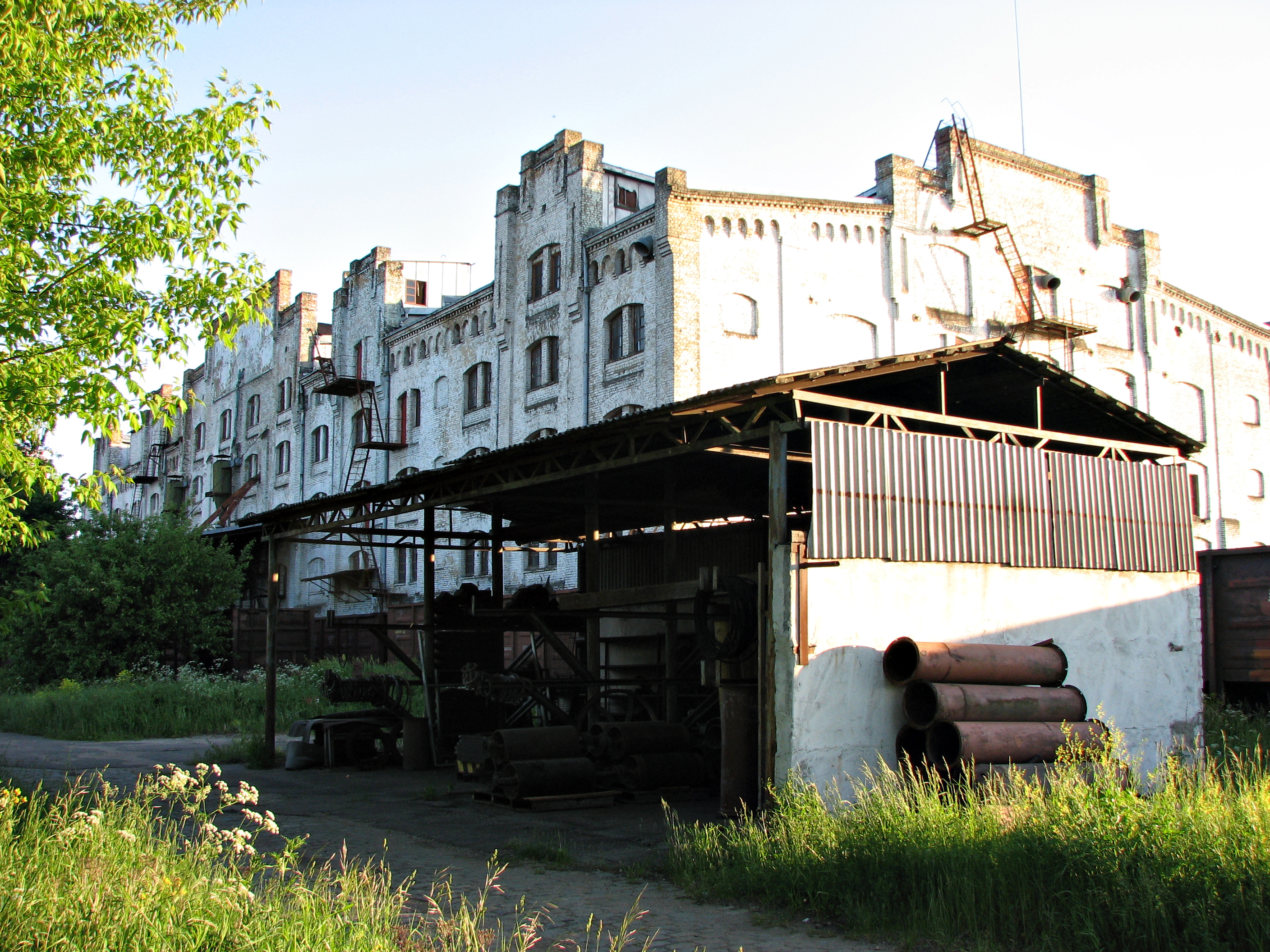

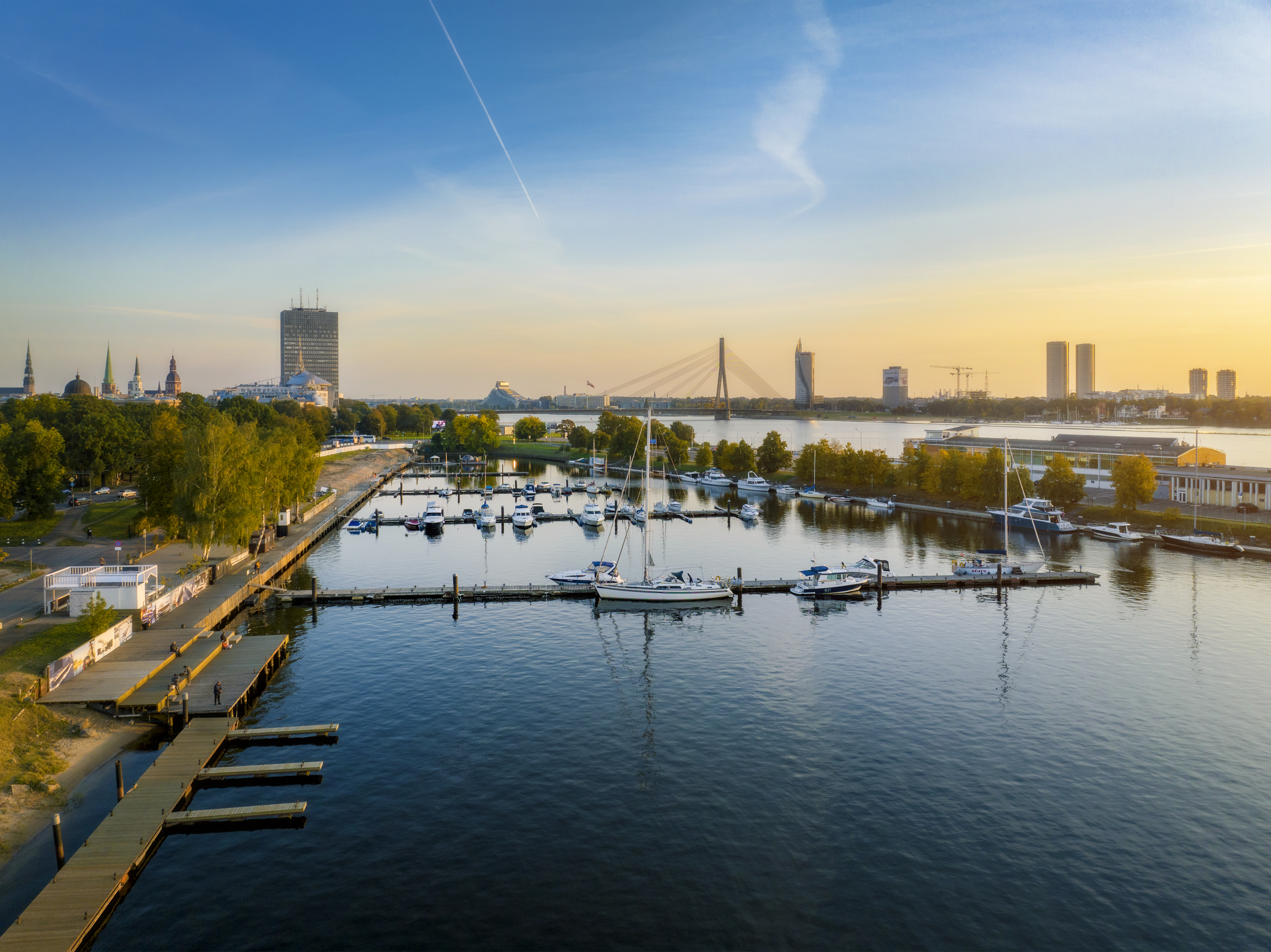

Andrejsala is an area located in the Pētersala-Andrejsala neighbourhood of Riga, Latvia within a former territory of an industrial port next to the city center. It had the potential to become a significant art, culture and entertainment center with exhibition halls, clubs, workshops, studios, cafe, hotel, but many of those dreams went into disrepair. The plans for future development of the area were in the works as of June, 2007, but as with classic cases of urbanisation, many of the artistic ventures disappeared. Buildings without heritage value in Andrejsala have been demolished one-by-one.

In 1282 Riga became a member of the Hanseatic League bringing both commerce and industry to Riga.

In 2001, Riga celebrated its 800th anniversary as a city.

On 1 May 2004 Latvia joined the European Union.

Riga development plan for years 2006 - 2018 envisions a cruise ship terminal at Andrejsala quay.

Andrejsala was the venue of every single Riga International Biennial of Contemporary Art edition.

== See also ==
- Timeline of Riga history
- History of Latvia
