= Mangaļsala =

Neighbourhood of Riga, Latvia

Coordinates: 57°03′N 24°04′E

- Neighbourhood of Riga
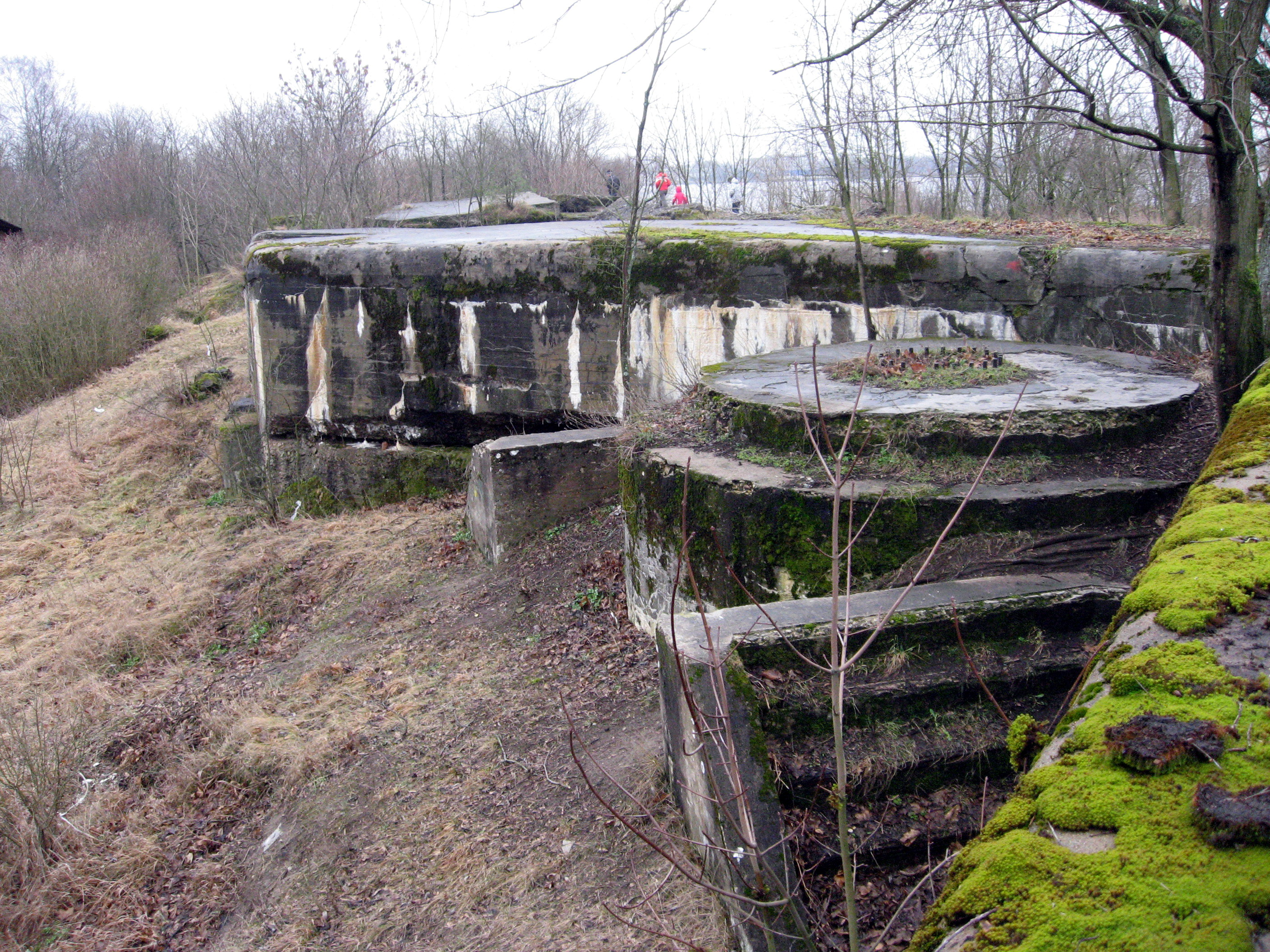
- Remains of Mangaļsala Fort

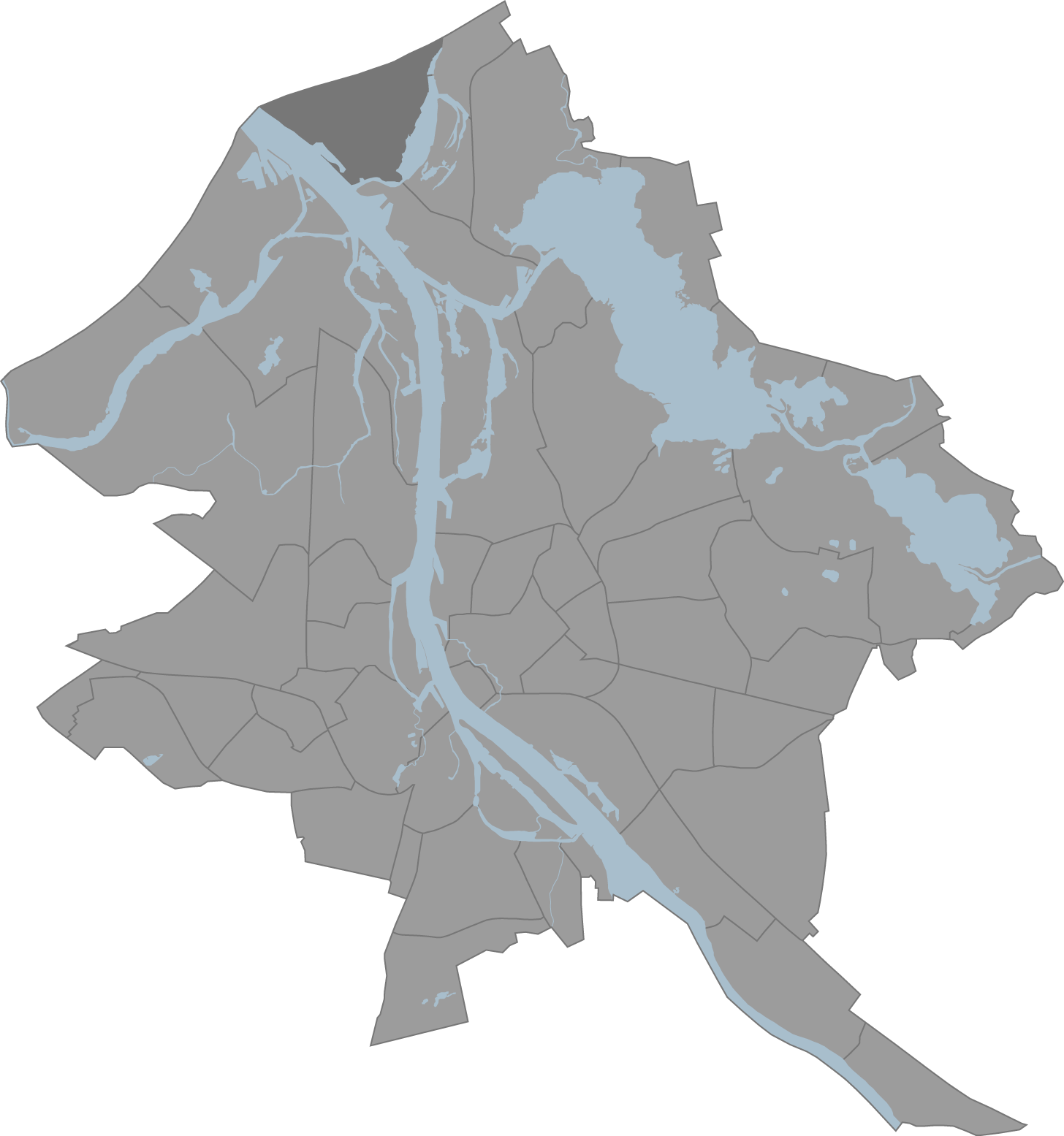
- Location of Mangaļsala in Riga
- Country: Latvia
- City: Riga
- District: Northern District

Area
  - Total: 8.036 km^{2} (3.103 sq mi)

Population (2017)
  - Total: 1,459
  - Density: 181.6/km^{2} (470.2/sq mi)
- Website: apkaimes.lv

Mangaļsala is a neighbourhood of Northern District in Riga, the capital of Latvia. It is located on the right bank of Daugava River, on the coast of the Gulf of Riga.
