= BA School of Business and Finance =

Business school in Riga, Latvia

- Banku Augstskola
- Former names: Banking College
- Type: University of Latvia business school
- Established: 1992; 34 years ago
- Parent institution: University of Latvia
- Rector: Līga Peiseniece
- Academic staff: 48
- Administrative staff: 75
- Students: 1468
- Undergraduates: 1145
- Postgraduates: 297
- Doctoral students: 26
- Location: Riga, Latvia; 56°58′32.17″N 24°8′5.87″E
- Website: www.ba.lv/en

BA School of Business and Finance (Latvian: Banku Augstskola) is a business school in Latvia that has been part of the University of Latvia since September 1, 2025. Founded in 1992 as the Banking College of Latvia under the Bank of Latvia, it received university accreditation in 1997.

In 2007 BA School of Business and Finance celebrated its 15th anniversary. It supports United Nations initiative and follows the Principles for Responsible Management Education. On December 11 BA School of Business and Finance announced its decision to achieve Investors in Excellence Standard (a national standard which is based on the concepts of Excellence and the nine criteria of the widely used European Excellence Model (EFQM)).

Today it offers undergraduate, graduate and post-graduate programmes in Economics and Entrepreneurship, Business Administration and Finance. The study processes have gained an explicit international dimension. Graduates are nationally and internationally recognized entrepreneurs, managers, consultants, experts and professionals.

On May 23, 2023, the Cabinet of Ministers of Latvia approved the merger of BA School of Business and Finance with the University of Latvia. The integration was completed on August 31, 2025, with BA maintaining its brand, name, and academic autonomy while operating as the University of Latvia's business school.

== Studies ==
The school offers the following study programmes:

First level professional education programmes

- Entrepreneurship
- Banking Operations
- Accountancy and Finance

Bachelor's degree study programmes

- Business administration
- Finance
- Risk management and Insurance
- Innovation and Product Development in Business

Master's degree study programmes

- Business Administration
- Finance
- International finance and Banking (double degree programme with the Swiss Business School based in Zürich)
- Creative Industries Management
- Innovative Entrepreneurship
- Financial Management
- Cybersecurity Management

Doctor's study programme (3 years)

- Joint Doctoral Programme in Business Administration

== Membership in international organizations ==
- Network of International Business Schools
- Professional Inter-University Management for Educational Networking
- European Association of Institutions in Higher Education
- Baltic Management Development Association
- Central and East European Management Development Association
- European Network for Business Studies and Languages
- European Foundation for Management Development
- Midlands Excellence/Investor in Excellence
