= Jaunogre Primary School =

School in Latvia

- Jaunogres pamatskola
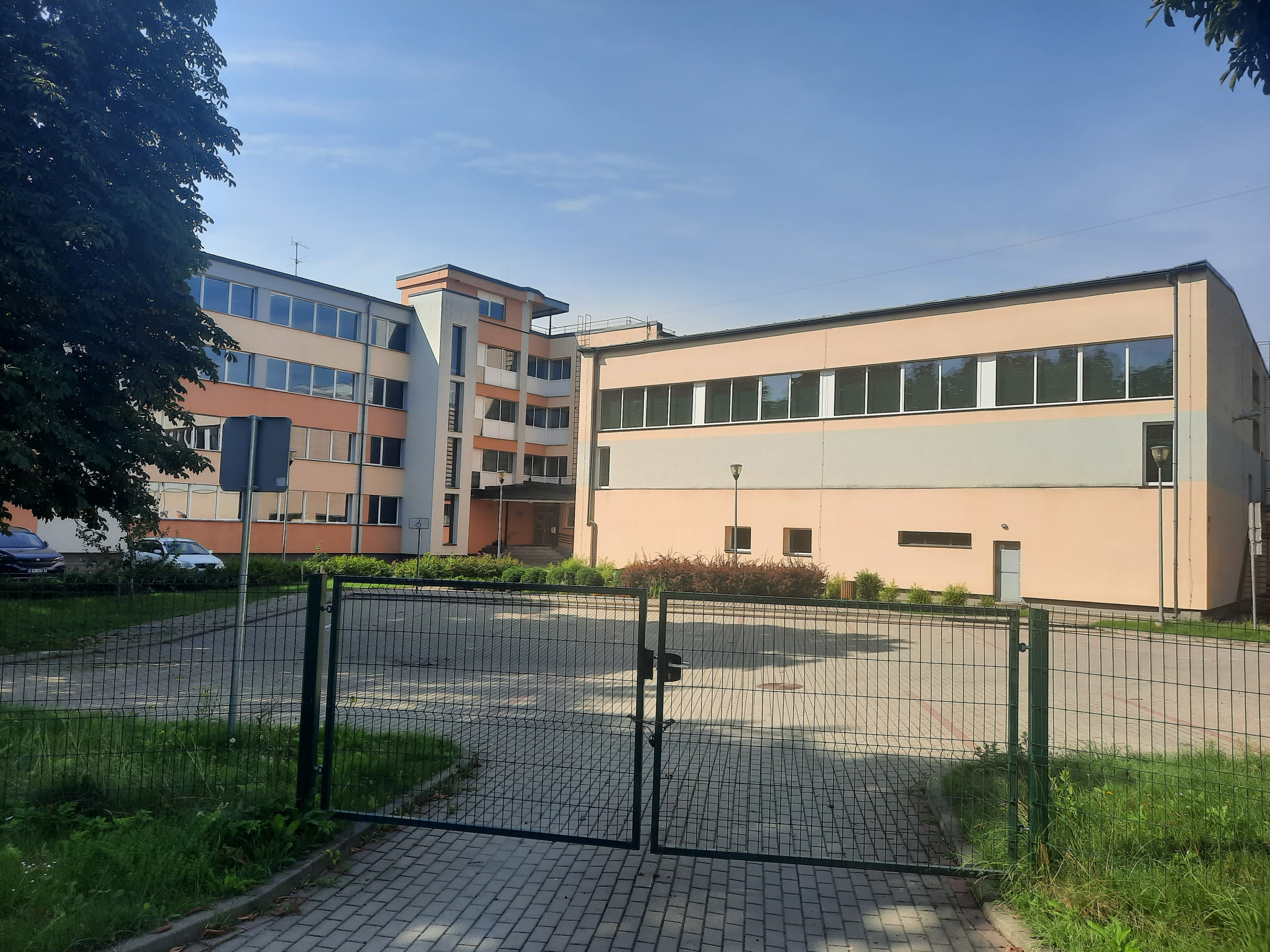

Location
- Mālkalnes prospekts 43; Ogre; Latvia
- Coordinates: 56°49′28.8084″N 24°35′38.7816″E

Information
- School type: State school, Primary school
- Founded: 1972

Jaunogre Primary School (Latvian: Jaunogres pamatskola) is the only educational establishment available for ethnic minorities in Ogre district with Russian as a teaching language.

== History ==
School was founded in 1972.

On February 8, 2018, Jaunogre Secondary School celebrated its 45th anniversary.

== Management and staff ==
=== Principals ===
- 1972–1980 – Aleksandrs Grišins
- 1980–1985 – Leonīds Sorokins
- 1986–1991 – Ņina Vaškevica
- 1991–2016 – Ludmila Sokolova
- 2017– – Aleksandrs Horuženko

== Facilities ==
Since 1992 classes are being held in two separate buildings located close to each other. One of which is used to be pre-school institution "Kamoliņš". Now in this building there are 1-4 classes but in the other 5-12 classes.

=== Museum ===
The school has its own museum in the school's building. It has gathered most important moments in school's life and historical events. For this purpose, the coterie "My school's history" was made. The group is led by Latvian language teacher Gaida Zeibote. She has created several exhibitions in the museum devoted to school's history, including photos and readable information about school principals and photos from important moments, projects and events.
