= Riga Secondary School No. 13 =

School in Riga, Latvia

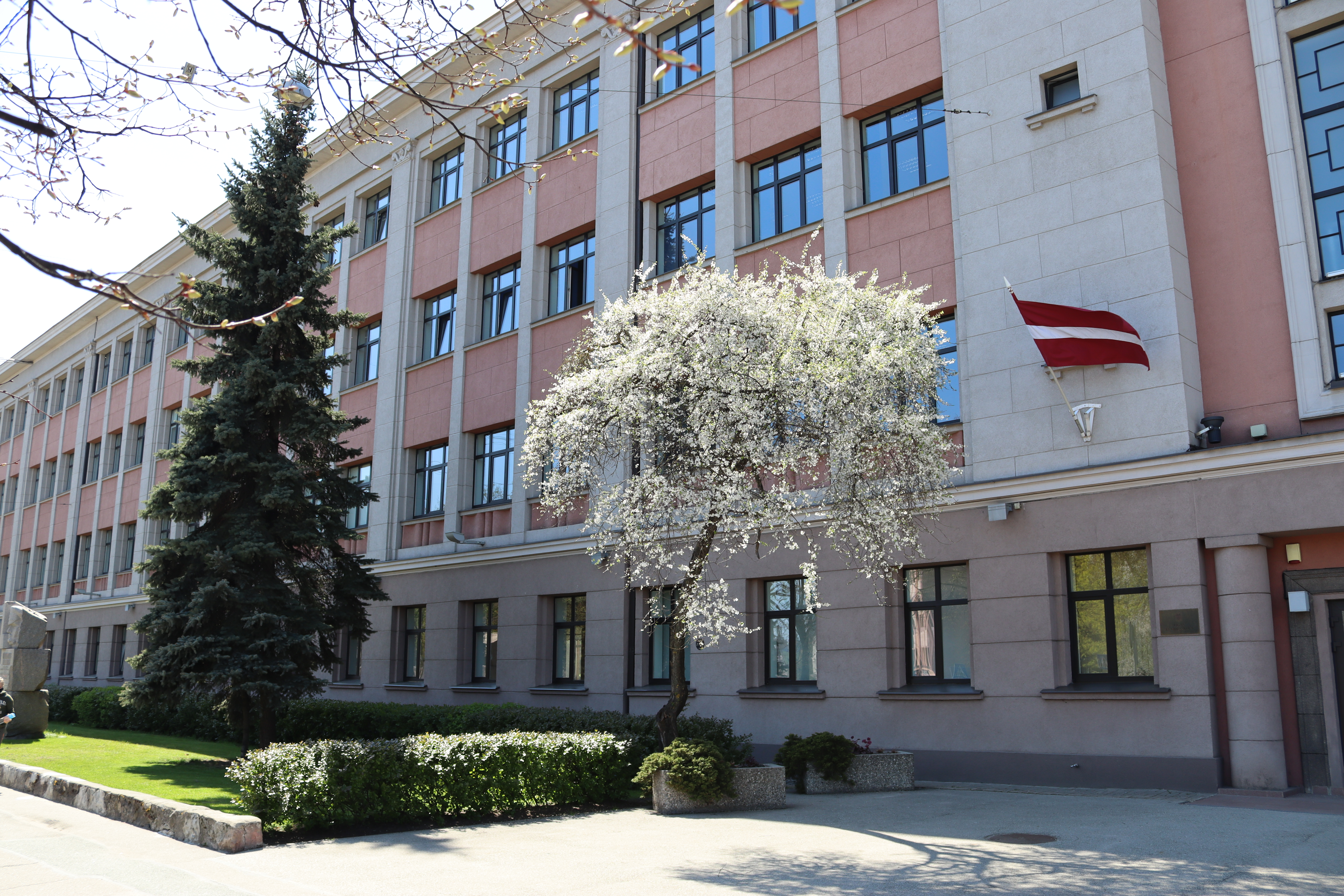

Location
- Riga; The Republic of Latvia; 56°57′44″N 24°06′20″E

Information
- Type: Municipal Educational establishment
- Established: 1951
- Director: Inna Burova
- Staff: 62
- Enrollment: 710
- Affiliations: Riga City Council Department of Education, Culture and Sports, Ministry of Education and Science of the Republic of Latvia
- Website: www.r13vsk.lv

Riga Secondary School No. 13 (Latvian: Rīgas 13. vidusskola) is one of the best-known educational establishments in Riga, Latvia. The school provides basic education and general secondary education programmes.

== History ==
The school was founded in 1951. The project of the historical building of the school was developed by Latvian architect Jānis Pūpols, consulted by professor J. Birznieks. Practical part of the construction was supervised by civil engineer Aleksandrs Sorokins. The school opened its doors for students on September 1, 1951. From 1957 to 1964, the school was known as Riga Polytechnic Work School No. 13.

== Organization ==
Directors of Riga Secondary School No. 13 :

1. N. Gendriks (1951 — 1958)
2. N. Liksašina (1958 — 1962)
3. J. Celova (1962 — 1970)
4. M. Kurašova (1970 — 1979)
5. N. Dņeprovska (1979 — 1983)
6. I. Freidenfelds (1983 — 1984)
7. L.Krutikova (1984-2020)
8. Liveta Sprūde-Kalme (2020-2024)

Since 2025 the School Director is Inna Burova.

School is being administrated also by the School Council. The chairmen of the School Council are the representatives of the School Administration, Student Council, students' parents, as well as the teachers' staff. The School Student Council is a democratic institution which represents interests of all the students of the school, as well as organizes the social life in the school (for example, organizing different events, concerts, conferences, seminars, facultative lessons, sports events etc.).

== Education ==
Riga Secondary School was one of the first schools with the Russian language as the language of the study process in Latvia. For many years the school has concentrated its attention on teaching mathematics and languages profiles. Almost all graduates of the school continue their education in university. The school supports and develops multicultural contacts in Latvia and abroad.

The work atmosphere in the school is student-friendly, all classrooms are comfortable and equipped with some modern high-tech equipment (computers, interactive boards, projectors, document cameras and other ICT devices). The territory of the school is being guarded by security service.

The Sports Hall, the Gymnastics Hall and the Canteen Room are also well-equipped. The Concert Hall is designed for parties, the honour ceremonies and extra-curricular activities.

In the School Library there are more than 2200 classbooks and more than 11 820 pieces of belles-lettres, as well as the multimedia system. Students and their parents can use computers in the Library. The school uses the web-based electronic journal MYKOOB where parents and students have the opportunity to see students’ marks, homework, lesson plans and other information. The school cloakroom is also very comfortable – each student has his own ambry.

During the summer holidays, students have a possibility to visit the summer camp «Lūcija» organised at school.

In 2007, Riga Secondary School No. 13 has been certified with the International Education Quality Certificate IES (International Education Society Ltd., London).
