= Ķīšezers, Riga =

Lake in Latvia

Ķīšezers
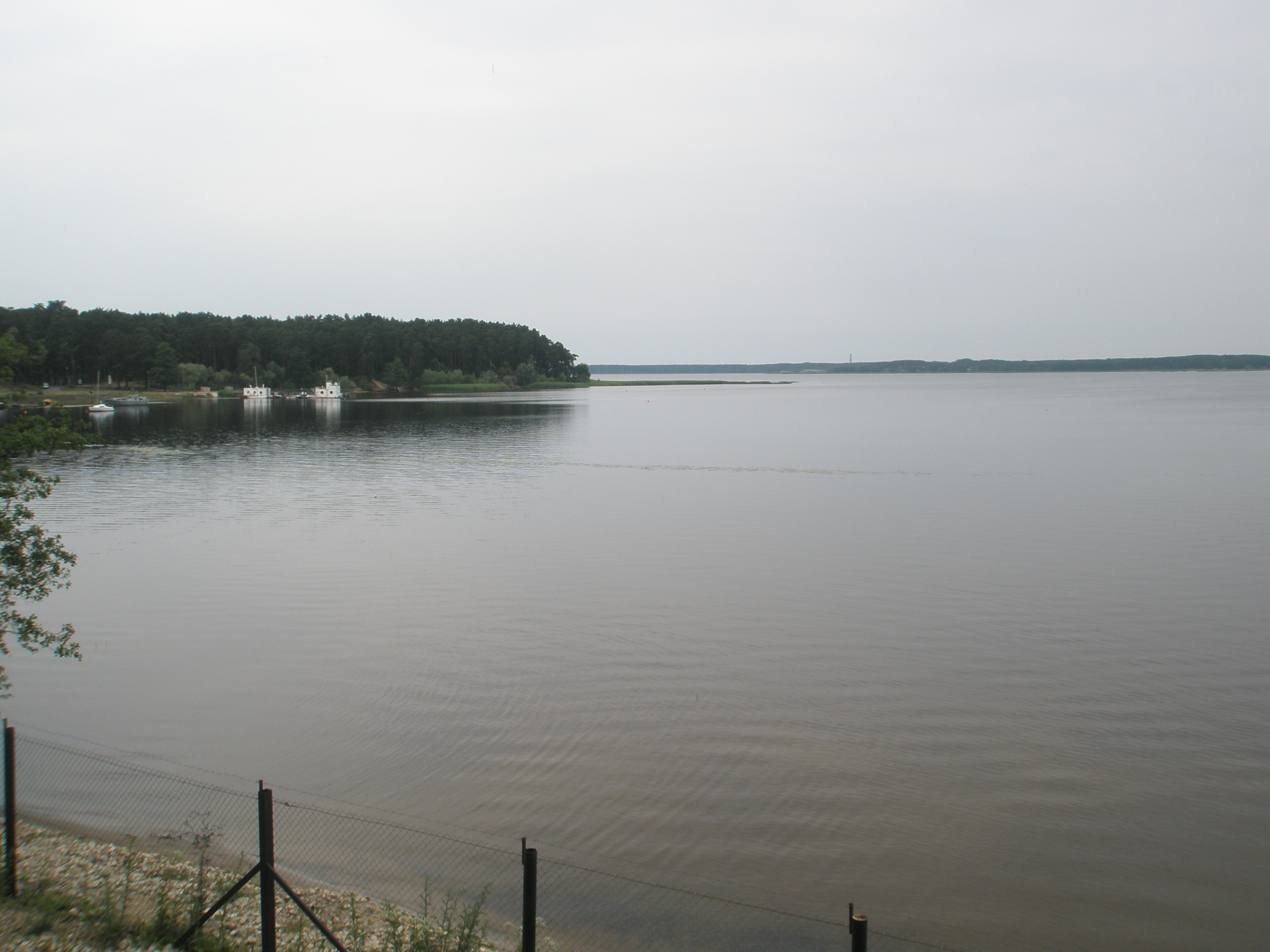
- Ķīšezers at Mežaparks

- Location within Latvia
- Interactive map of Ķīšezers
- Location: Riga
- Coordinates: 57°1′21″N 24°10′27″E
- Primary inflows: Jugla River
- Catchment area: Daugava River
- Basin countries: Latvia
- Max. length: 8.4 km (5.2 mi)
- Surface area: 1,730 ha (4,300 acres) (1998)
- Average depth: 2.4 metres (7 ft 10 in) (1972)
- Max. depth: 4.2 metres (14 ft) (1972)
- Surface elevation: 0.1 m (3.9 in)
- Islands: 3
- Settlements: Riga

Ķīšezers is a lake in Riga, Latvia, with primary inflow of the Jugla River. The lake is 1,730 ha (4,300 acres) large, it has 2.4 metres (7 ft 10 in) of average depth and reaches 4.2 metres (14 ft) at the deepest point.

,
