= Neighbourhoods in Riga =

Semi-official subdivisions of Riga, Latvia

Since Latvian independence in 1918, Riga has never had an fully functional official territorial division of the city that would be smaller than six administrative divisions, even though a division of Riga into 47 micro regions (Latvian: mikrorajoni) was initiated during the Soviet occupation. The borders of the micro regions only partly coincide with the borders of the districts and suburbs, and common borders were only at an initial stage.

Historically, even smaller micro region divisions were used. An example would be Spilve, that consisted of Beķermuiža, Krēmeri, Voleri, Rātsupe and Lielā muiža. The fact, that these smaller regions had no officially existing borders often created trouble as the interpretation of them among inhabitants and civil servants were quite different. From 1934 to the Soviet occupation of Latvia, 40 'administrative regions' (administratīvie rajoni) were formally established in the city, but the apparently fell into disuse after 1940.

In 2007, the Riga City Council Development Agency began work on the new Riga regions, according to the new plan — definition of neighbourhoods. Finalized in 2012, the city is currently divided into 58 neighbourhoods (Latvian: apkaimes, sing. apkaime), each with its own centre, its own unique architectural form and landscape. Officially, the neighborhoods were envisioned as city planning and local identity units, not intended to be a form of an official administrative division. However, while their legal status is unclear, neighborhoods have become the more frequently used unit used by both the municipality (e.g. by supporting local neighborhood/resident associations under the Riga Neighborhoods Alliance umbrella) and its inhabitants, as well have been recognized by the Central Statistics Bureau of Latvia and other state institutions.

The neighborhood concept or its elements are gradually also being adopted by other Latvian cities, such as Jelgava, Liepāja, Jūrmala and others.

== Map of neighbourhoods in Riga ==
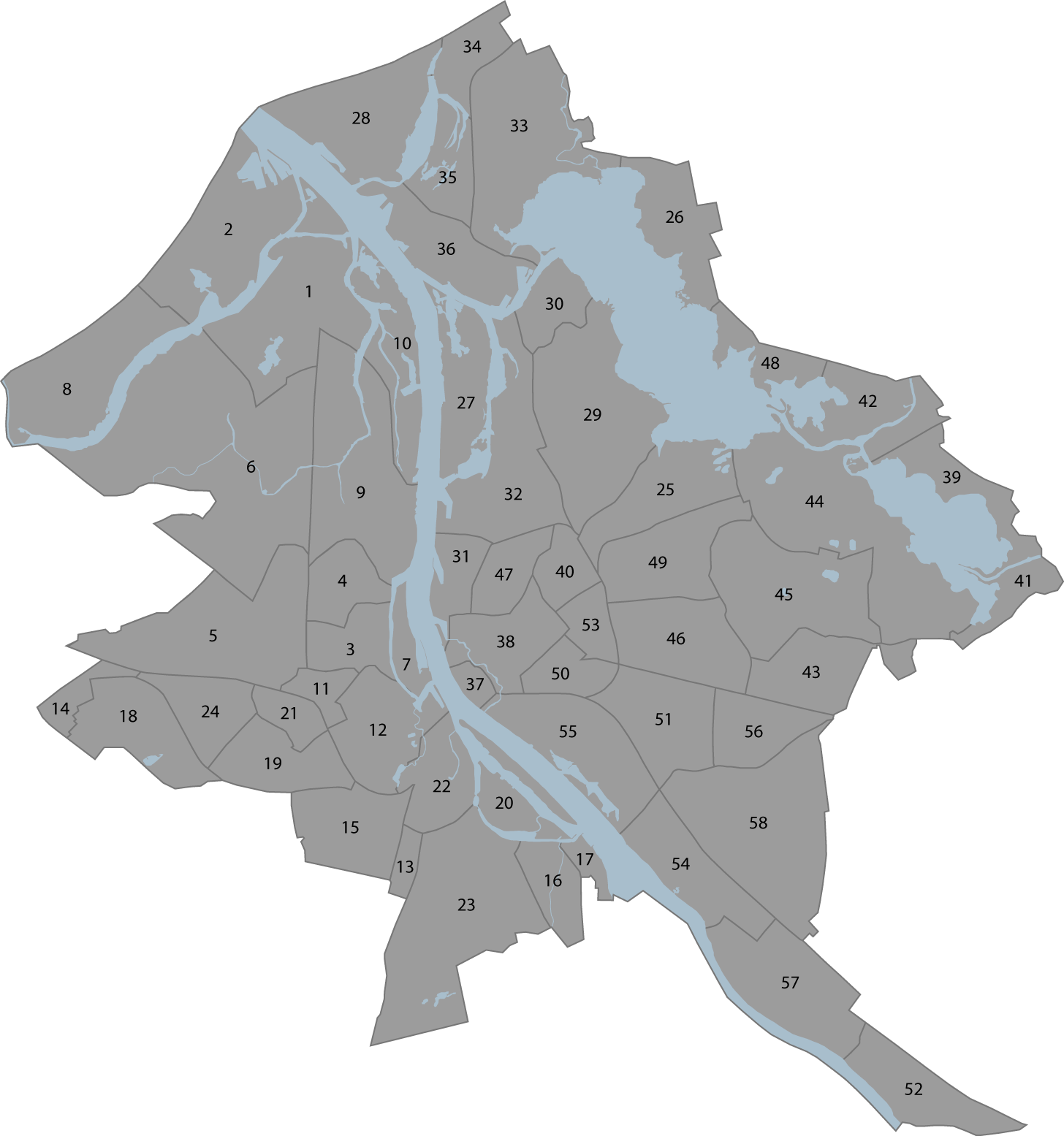

1. Bolderāja
2. Daugavgrīva
3. Dzirciems
4. Iļģuciems
5. Imanta
6. Kleisti
7. Ķīpsala
8. Rītabuļļi
9. Spilve
10. Voleri
11. Zasulauks
12. Āgenskalns
13. Atgāzene
14. Beberbeķi
15. Bieriņi
16. Bišumuiža
17. Katlakalns
18. Mūkupurvs
19. Pleskodāle
20. Salas
21. Šampēteris
22. Torņakalns
23. Ziepniekkalns
24. Zolitūde
25. Čiekurkalns
26. Jaunciems
27. Kundziņsala
28. Mangaļsala
29. Mežaparks
30. Mīlgrāvis
31. Pētersala-Andrejsala
32. Sarkandaugava
33. Trīsciems
34. Vecāķi
35. Vecdaugava
36. Vecmīlgrāvis
37. Vecrīga
38. Centrs
39. Berģi
40. Brasa
41. Brekši
42. Bukulti
43. Dreiliņi
44. Jugla
45. Mežciems
46. Purvciems
47. Skanste
48. Suži
49. Teika
50. Avoti
51. Dārzciems
52. Dārziņi
53. Grīziņkalns
54. Ķengarags
55. Latgale neighbourhood
56. Pļavnieki
57. Rumbula
58. Šķirotava
