= Tet (company) =

Telecommunications company

- Type: Private
- Founded: 1992; 34 years ago
- Headquarters: Riga, Latvia
- Area served: Latvia
- Key people: Uldis Tatarcuks (board president and CEO)
- Services: Voice services, Internet, TV, Data services, IT products and services, Tet store
- Revenue: LVL 137.6 million (2011)
- Net income: LVL 20.8 million (2011)
- Total assets: 280,113,911 euro (2023)
- Number of employees: 1,707(2018)
- Website: tet.lv

Tet (formerly Lattelekom and Lattelecom) is a Latvian internet service provider, telecommunications, technology and entertainment company. It has also been an electricity service provider since 2017.

The Tet Group includes SIA Tet, Lattelecom BPO, Citrus Solutions, Lattelecom Technology and Baltic Computer Academy (Latvian: Baltijas Datoru akadēmija, BDA). It provides electronic communications, IT, business process outsourcing and training services in Latvia.

51% of Tet shares are owned by the Latvian government, but the remaining 49% are owned by the Scandinavian company Telia Company. Tet, in turn, owns 23% of the Latvian mobile operator's LMT shares.

== History ==
=== Origin ===
The Latvian state-owned State Company Tet (Latvian: Valsts uzņēmums "Tet", meaning "Now") was registered with the Register of Enterprises of the Republic of Latvia on January 9, 1992. Its origins were based on local telecommunications infrastructure and services previously operated by the Soviet Ministry of Communications. On December 22, 1993, the Cabinet of Ministers approved the commission's decision to select the British and Finnish consortium TILTS Communications as the winner of the tender for modernizing Latvia's telecommunications network. On January 14, 1994, the agreement with TILTS Communications was concluded and SIA Lattelekom was established. As a result of the privatization, 49% of the company's shares were acquired by two foreign investors,– Cable and Wireless and Telecom Finland, which later became part of TeliaSonera AB.

Cable and Wireless later sold its shares to TeliaSonera. Until January 1, 2003, the company held a monopoly on fixed voice communication services.

==== Monopoly ====
A 2001 telecommunications law reduced Lattelekom's fixed-line monopoly term to January 1, 2003, as part of the liberalization of Latvia's telecommunications market. Tet is also one of the owners of Latvijas Mobilais Telefons.

=== First rebrand (2006) ===
On May 18, 2006, Lattelecom implemented a rebranding, replacing the existing corporate brand name with a new brand name. Before the 2006 name change, the company had undergone a reorganisation that included SIA Lattelecom Technology and group companies involved in customer services, business process outsourcing, IT&T and content services.

The official company name, SIA Lattelekom was changed to SIA Lattelecom. The IT service provider SIA Micro Link Latvia was renamed Lattelecom Technology, and SIA C1, which had been engaged in business process outsourcing, was renamed SIA Lattelecom BPO. The network construction and maintenance company SIA Citrus Solutions retained its name.

=== Second rebrand (2019) ===
In October 2018, Lattelecom announced that they will gradually change their name to Tet, their electricity service providers' name used since 2016, with the change officially starting from on April 1, 2019. Entertainment services continued to use the Helio and Shortcut brands.

== Lattelecom Group ==
Lattelecom Group consists of five companies: SIA Tet, SIA Lattelecom BPO, SIA Citrus Solutions, SIA Lattelecom Technology and the Lattelecom Technology subsidiary SIA Baltijas Datoru Akadēmija. Tet provides Internet, voice and television services. Lattelecom BPO provides business process outsourcing and 1188 directory inquiry services. Lattelecom Technology provides IT services. Baltijas Datoru Akadēmija is a training and certification centre for information and communication technology (ICT). Citrus Solutions is a network construction and maintenance company.

== Products and services ==
=== Tet Internet ===
Tet offers several Internet access technologies, including broadband DSL (ADSL2+ and VDSL), fiber optic Internet using GPON, Wi-Fi and 4G internet.

==== Optical fiber Internet ====
In 2009 Lattelecom started offering residential fiber optic services with speeds of up to 100 megabits per second. In September 2009, Lattelecom announced that some fiber optic connections could reach 1 gigabit per second. Zolitūde was the first residential area in Riga where the Lattelecom fiber optic Internet service was made available (in January 2009), followed later by Kengarags, Purvciems, Plavnieki, Ziepniekkalns and other locations. Jelgava was the first city where fiber optic Internet was made available from areas other than Riga, but late in 2009 the Lattelecom fiber optic service was also made accessible in other cities, such as Daugavpils, Salaspils, etc. Initially, fiber optic network expansion work was carried out in the newly built dwelling areas in Riga and other largest cities of the country the rational being that return on the investment in the development of the network is possible to attain only if the newly connected building has at least 30 apartments.

The service used GPON technology. In the middle of 2012, Lattelecom fiber optic internet was available to 450,000 households throughout Latvia, about half of Latvian households. The network covered more than 45 towns and residential areas in Latvia.

==== Baltic Highway ====
A significant data transfer route, the Baltic Highway opened in 2012. The project connected the Baltic States, Poland and Germany, with an extension to the Russian Federation, and was implemented by Lattelecom in cooperation with Deutsche Telekom and MegaFon. Its initial capacity was 40 x 10 Gbit/s. The total infrastructure covered more than 45 towns and residential areas in Latvia.

==== Wi-Fi ====
Currently more than 4,500 Wi-Fi access points are available throughout Latvia.

=== Lattelecom TV ===
In 2011 Lattelecom became the largest TV service provider in the Baltic States, reaching a total of 230,000 charge TV customers subscribing to the company's three TV services – Terrestrial television, Interactive television and Internet television.

Since March 1, 2011, the company offered Internet TV on mobile devices such as smartphones and tablet computers. The service was also marketed for use on computers, tablet computers and mobile phones.

==== Interactive TV/Tet TV ====
Lattelecom Interactive TV, now known as Tet TV, is a television service transmitted over a broadband Internet connection. Its features included video rental, time-shift viewing and recording of programmes and films.

==== Digital Terrestrial TV/Virszemes Tet TV ====
After a tender organised by the Ministry of Transport, Lattelecom (now Tet) was selected to carry out Latvia's transition to digital terrestrial broadcasting; the Cabinet of Ministers approved its role on 27 January 2009.

Lattelecom Terrestrial TV provided digital over-the-air broadcasting that could be received using an indoor or external aerial. It carried national and other free-to-air channels in Latvia.

16 July 2026 Tet announce the end of DTT Pay-TV services from 1 January 2027

==== Tet TV+ ====
Lattelecom began testing online television in Latvia in 2010.

Internet television on mobile devices has been available since March 2012. The service made television available on PCs, tablet computers and smartphones.

In 2016, Lattelecom launched an online streaming service and an entertainment platform Shortcut.

== Privatisation ==
Tet is a former state-owned telecommunications company. In 1994, 49% of the company's stock was sold to two foreign investors, Cable and Wireless and Telecom Finland, which is now part of TeliaSonera. Cable and Wireless later sold its stake to TeliaSonera. As of 2025, the Latvian state owned 51% of Tet, while Telia's subsidiary Tilts Communications owned the remaining 49%.

In July 2025, Telia signed a memorandum of understanding with the Latvian state, Latvenergo and the Latvian State Radio and Television Centre to sell its shares in Tet and LMT. Reuters reported that the planned divestment covered Telia's 49% stake in Tet and its 60.3% stake in LMT. In February 2026, LSM reported that advisers had begun work on structuring the acquisition and the investor-selection process for the planned transaction.

== Profits and performance ==
The revenue of Lattelecom in 2011 amounted to LVL 135.8 million, which is a LVL 3.8 million drop year on year. Television, Internet and data services accounted for revenue increases, while revenue from voice calls declined. The normalized EBITDA profit indicator of Lattelecom in 2011 was LVL 47.5 million. (LVL 45.6 million in 2010), EBITDA profit norm of 35%. The profit of Lattelecom in 2011 amounted to LVL 20.8 million, which is an 8% increase from 2010 (LVL 19.3 million).

== Headcount ==
2,174 employees worked for Lattelecom group as of late 2011.

=== Connect, Latvia! ===
Connect, Latvia! (Pieslēdzies, Latvija!) was a digital-literacy project for people aged over 50, focused on basic PC and Internet skills. In 2011, 150 groups were organized throughout Latvia, with more than 1,500 people acquiring the basics of theoretical and practical PC skills. In 2012 computer sciences teachers were attracted for the training of senior clients, thus raising the number of trainees to 6,000. Training for seniors is organized in small groups – approximately 14 participants per group. Training in each group lasts three days, spending four academic hours (45 minutes each) on training daily.
