= Pleskodāle =

Neighbourhood of Riga, Latvia

Coordinates: 56.9325°N 24.0364°E

- Neighbourhood of Riga
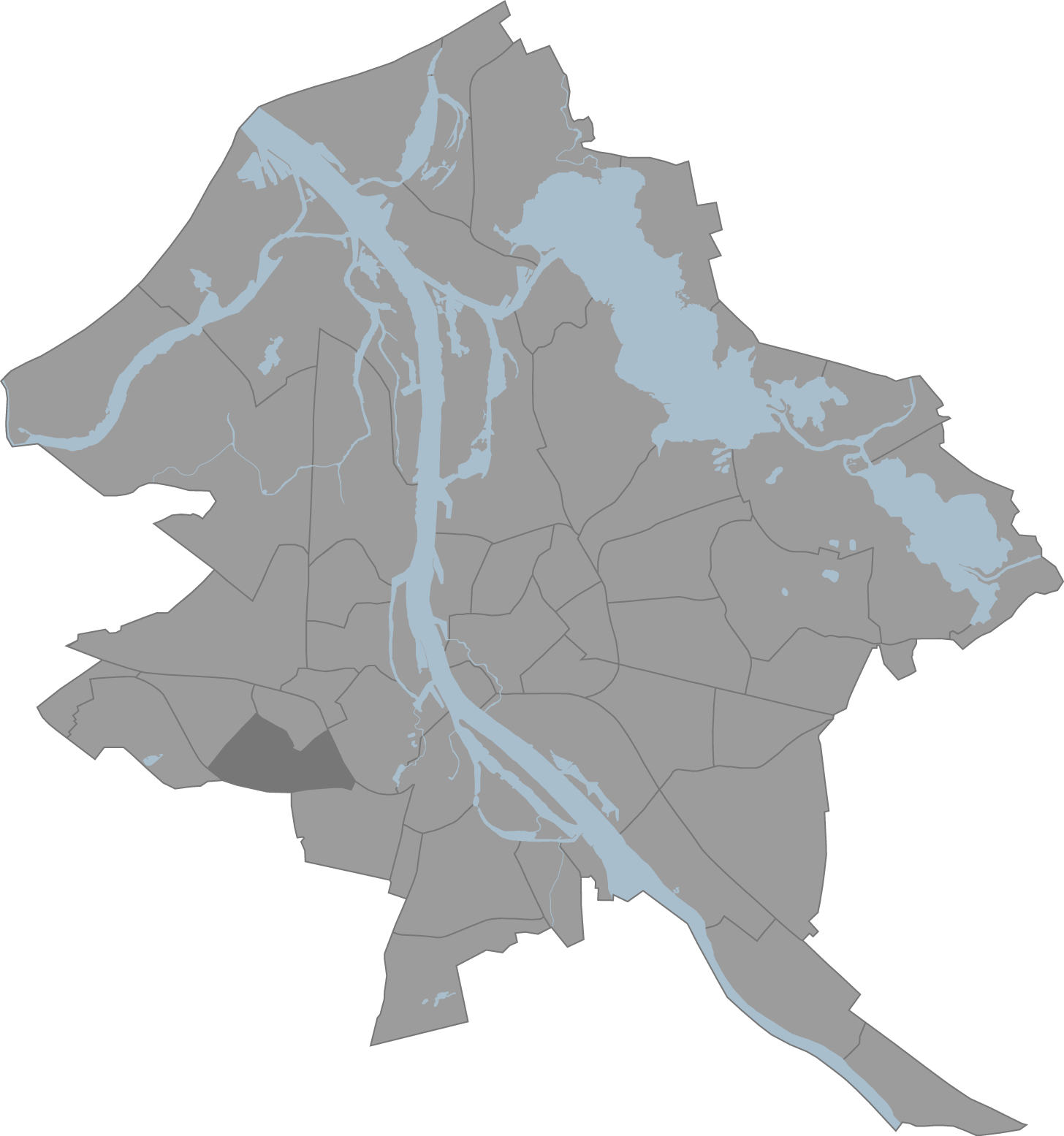
- Location of Pleskodāle in Riga
- Country: Latvia
- City: Riga
- District: Zemgale Suburb

Area
  - Total: 3.480 km^{2} (1.344 sq mi)

Population (2024)
  - Total: 5,085
  - Density: 1,461/km^{2} (3,785/sq mi)
- Website: apkaimes.lv

Pleskodāle is a neighbourhood of Riga consisting mostly of private houses on the western side of the city. It borders the Zolitūde and Šampēteris neighbourhoods.
