= Pārdaugava =

Area associated with Riga, Latvia

Coordinates: 56°55′N 24°06′E

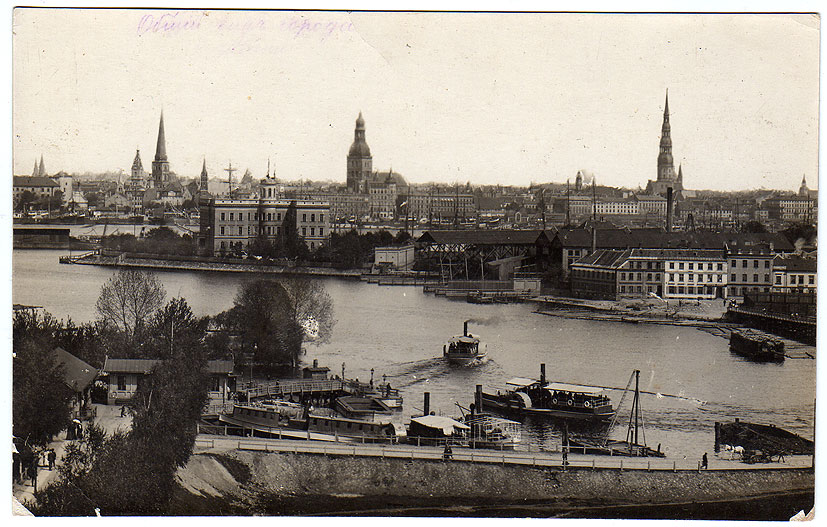
Panoramic view of Riga seen from Pārdaugava side of the Daugava River. Vintage viewcard from the early 20th century.

Pārdaugava (literally means "Trans" or "Over" -Daugava area, formerly German: Überdüna) is an area most often associated with Latvia's capital Riga, composed of several neighbourhoods on the west (left) bank of Daugava River. The name is literally translated as 'over Daugava'.

In the late Soviet period (around 1990) in Riga appeared several sports teams with such name and previously were associated with the Soviet Daugava club (originally associated with Soviet Dynamo sports society). Those were football team FK Pārdaugava and hockey team Dinamo Riga (original).

== History ==
Since the 13th century, what is now Pārdaugava was part of the patrimonial area of Riga, or the Rural District, which belonged to the City of Riga. This territory was granted to the city by the papal legate William of Modena as early as 1226. In 1248 a Crusader stone house or tower on the other side of the Daugava (Latin: Turris antiqua trans Dunum, in the 18th century known as the Red Tower) was mentioned. One of the oldest manor houses in the outer town was St. The manor of the St. George's Hospitaller (Convent of the Holy Spirit) in what is now Dzirciems and Ilguciems. The forests, arable land and pastures in Pārdaugava were used and cultivated by the townspeople, who paid ground rent to the town. There were manors of Riga landlords and city manors.

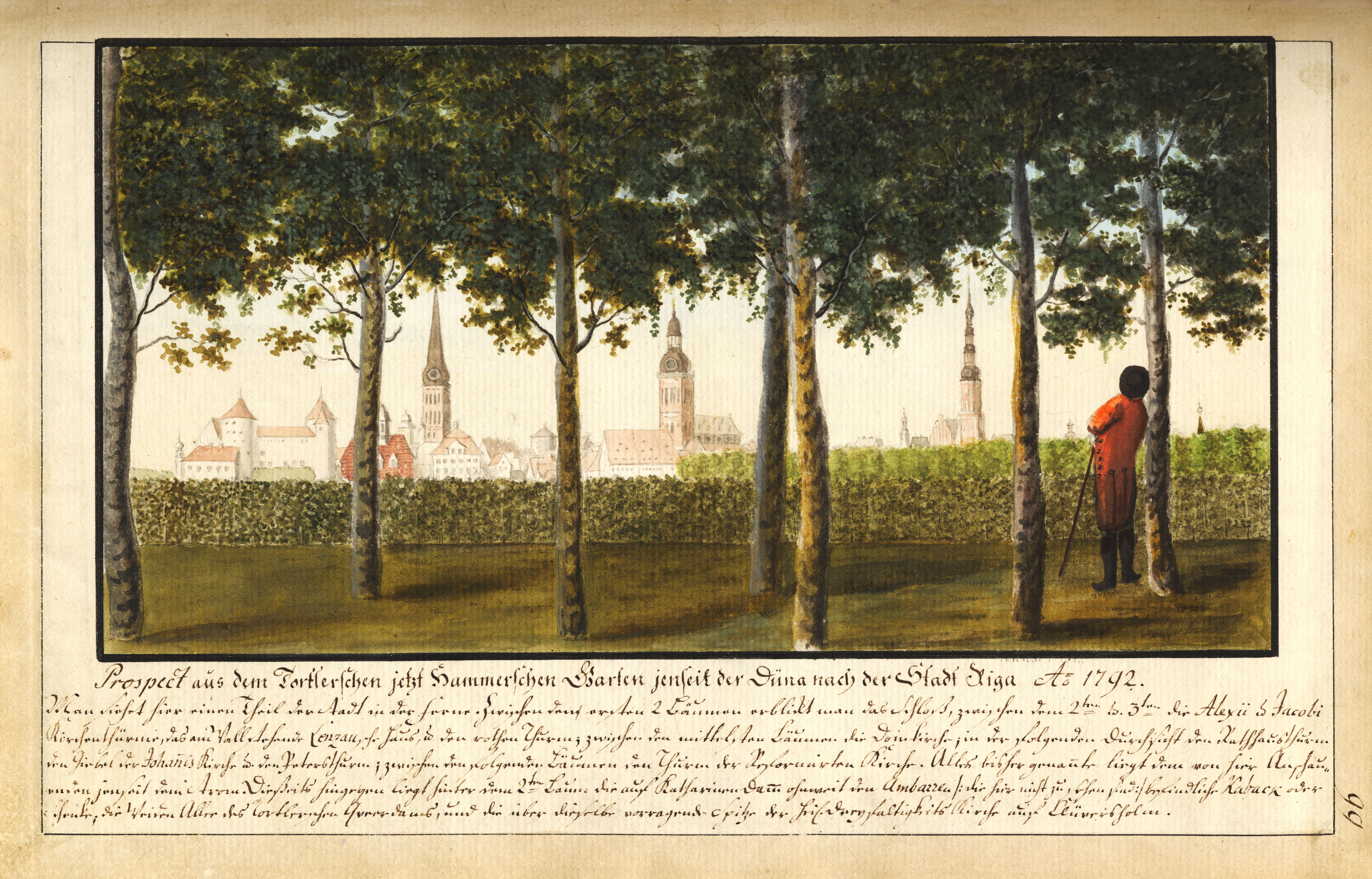
View of Riga from the Pārdaugava side (Brotze, 1792).

By the 17th century, longitudinal roads had been established in Pārdaugava, starting at Agenskalns Bay and along the Zunda, through the villages of Jura and Iļģi and across Spilves Meadows to Bolderāja and Daugavgrīva. During the Great Northern War, the Battle of Spilves took place in Spilves Meadows and the buildings of Pārdaugava were destroyed, but later rebuilt.

In 1786, the lands of the Hagen estate in Pārdaugava (the Agenskalns area) were incorporated into the territory of the city of Riga, and it became a summer cottage district and recreational area for the wealthiest citizens. In 1787, by order of Empress Catherine II of Russia, the third or Jelgava suburb (Mitauer Vorstadt) was established as the territorial division of Riga City. In 1794, the Alton out-of-town amusement institution was opened at Mara's Pond, which gave its name to the streets of Altonava. In 1812, fearing the approach of Napoleon's troops, all the buildings in Pārdaugava were burnt down, so the buildings visible today date mainly from the first half of the 19th century onwards. After the abolition of serfdom in 1819, most of the land was rented out or sold to the peasants of Pārdaugava. As the city grew, the suburb of Jelgava with its industrial enterprises developed in Pārdaugava.

In 1877, when the 1870 Statute of Cities of the Russian Empire was introduced in the Baltic provinces, the so-called "number districts" (about 6,780 hectares) were placed under the administration of Riga City. It included many plots and manors that had been transferred from the patrimonial area of the city to private ownership, serfdom or lease (in 1879 there were about 1000 of them). The area under the administrative authority thus extended beyond the boundaries of the city police district. In 1905, the Riga City Board submitted a new draft of Riga's boundaries to the government for approval, which included an area of about 9014 hectares (808 hectares of which were waters), but this too was not approved. The project envisaged the annexation of a large area to the city, including Ziepniekkalns, part of Bierini Manor, Pleskodale White Manor, Podrag and other areas of Pārdaugava. In 1919, the project was extended to include Spilvi and other areas within the city boundaries (the total area of the city was approximately 12 850 hectares). Only on 20 February 1924 the law on the administrative boundaries of the city was adopted, which included a wide area of Pārdaugava, including Bolderāja, Daugavgrīva, Bulli Manor, Kleistu Manor, Great and Small Damme Manor, Solitude Manor, Annin Manor, Šampēteri and the remaining part of Bieriņi Manor.

After the occupation of Latvia, Riga was divided into six administrative-territorial districts, the Lenin and Red Army districts being created on the left bank of the Daugava, in accordance with the system of administration existing in the Soviet Union. The division was abolished by the German occupying power, but in 1944, after the arrival of the Red Army, the administrative-territorial division was restored with minor changes: on the left bank of the Daugava, the Red Army District was added to the Lenin District. In 1962, the merged districts were divided. In 1969, Leningrad District was created in the part separated from Lenin District.

In 1990, after the restoration of independence of the Republic of Latvia, Leningrad District was renamed Kurzeme District, and Lenin District - Zemgale suburb.

== Manor houses in Pārdaugava ==
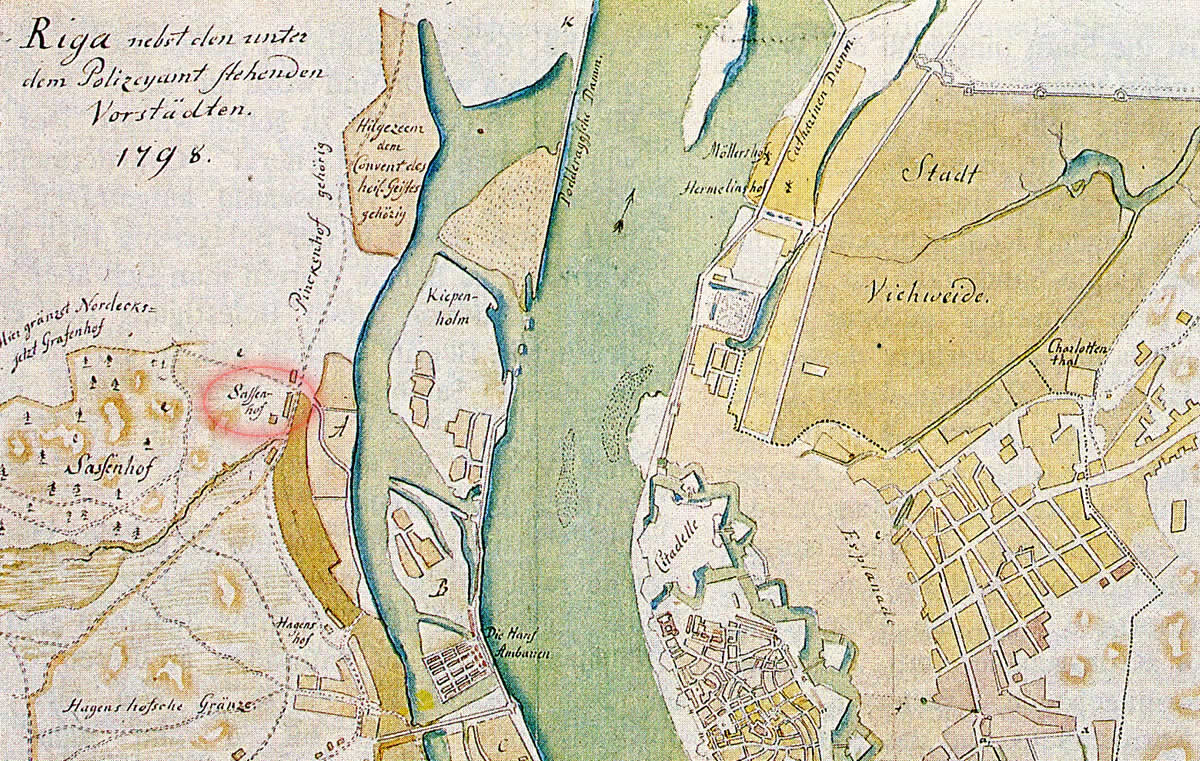
The surroundings of Zasumuiža and Hagen Manor (Brotze, 1798).

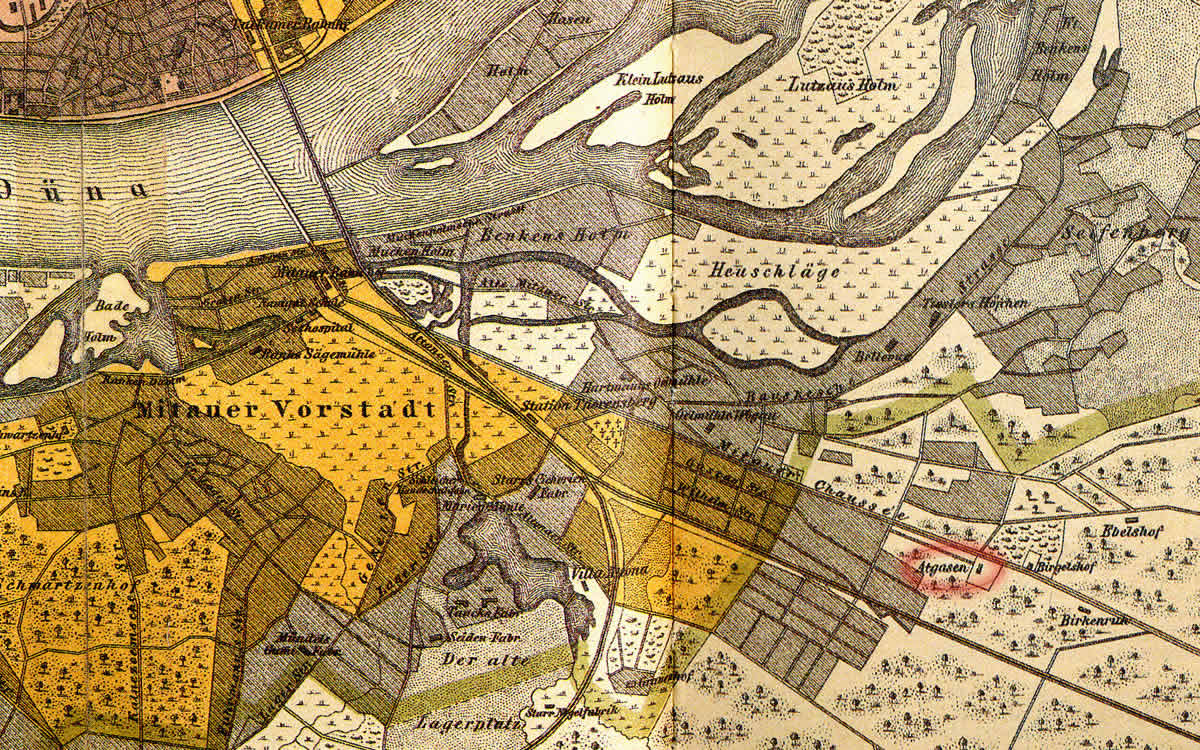
Jelgava suburb on the 1879 map.

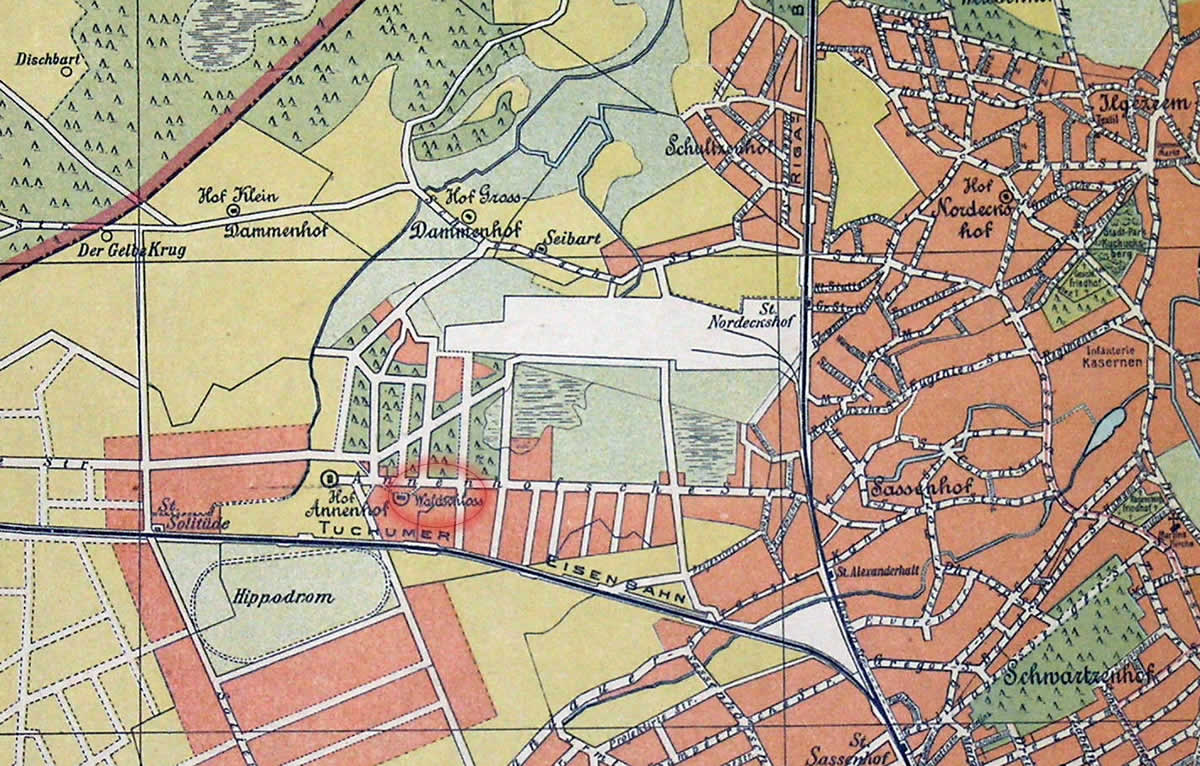
Pārdaugava on the 1917 map during the German occupation (Riga offensive).

- Hagenshof, later Schvarcmuiža, now 19/21 Daugavgrīva Street
- Zuckerbecker Höfchen (Zuckerbecker Höfchen), now at 16 Slokas Street, where the State Archives building is now
- Hartmannsches Höfchen (1786), also Port Manor, Fenger Manor, now Kalnciema Street 28/30
- Hay Höfchen, now at 25 Daugavgrīva Street
- Haman Manor (1886), now 41 Sloka Street
- St Martin's Church Rectory (c. 1852–1853), 3 Mārtiņa Street
- Willischhof (Willisch Manor), now Kārlis Ulmanis gatve, east of the Liepājas Street junction
- Ūlenbroka manor house, approximately in the area of Slampe and Amula Streets near Marupīte
- Vegesackshof, also Atgāzenes Manor, in the area of the present Vienības gatve 87 and Atgāzenes street 24a
- Birkenhof (Birkenruh), now at 11 Vienības gatve
- Bieriņi Manor, also Liepumuiža (Lindenruh, Lindenruhe, 1870), Bieriņi, 10 Kantora Street
- Borchert Manor (c. 1750), also Graves, Wittenhof, Lievenhof, Wittinghofs-Hof, Bieriņi, Zvārdes iela 1
- Bišumuiža (Bienenhof), also Schilderhof, Schillerhof, Hilsenhof, now 147a Bauskas Street
- Helene Manor, now 133 Bauskas Street
- Nummershof, between the present Ziepniekkalna Street and the Bišumuižas ditch, north of the ditch crossing
- Pinkarts Manor (Pinkartshof, Näsenhof), also Bieķēnsala Manor, Bieķēnu Manor, approximately at present Bauskas Street 130
- Bolderaja Manor (Bolderaa, Berghof, Ahaken), also Harbour Master's House, Bolderāja, near the Bulupe River, at 22 Lielupes Street
- Gouvernementshof (Gouvernementshof), Bolderāja, in the southern part of the district, by the Hapaka ditch, opposite Krievu sala
- Lohfeldshof (Lohfeld Manor), also Lohfeld Manor, Bolderāja, near the Hapaka ditch, on the territory of the Lignums factory
- Dresden Manor, also Dresden House (Dresdenhaus), summer house of Dresden, a Riga court official and writer, at 37/39 Daugavgrīva Street
- Franzenhof (Franzen Manor), in the Dzegužkalns area
- Gerstenmeier Manor, now Eiženijas iela 20 - 22
- Manor House, 17th century house of the Daugava ferryman Ansis Manor House, between now Zunda and Daugavgrīva Streets, where the professor of veterinary medicine at Vilnius University Kārlis Dāvids Justs Manor House was born
- Sassenhof, in the area of now 70 - 74 Daugavgrīva Street, owned since 1759 by Janis Steinhauers, the Riga Crown mast sorter
- White Manor (Weißenhof), also Meller's, Dahl's, Haltermanns Höfchen (Haltermanns Höfchen), Ilguciems, at the end of Balta Street, near Spilves Street 5
- Nordeckshof (Nordeck manor), belonged to Hermann Withe von Nordeck, a member of the Riga Town Council, also Graves, Fridrich, Vogel, Reims manor, Ilguciems, 16 Bulļu Street
- Annen Manor (Annenhof, first mentioned in 1595), also Marianna, Meinershoff, Meyners Hof, Imanta, at the present Jurmala Avenue between Annin Manor Boulevard and Dumbrāja Street
- Damme Manor, divided into Lieldamme (Großdammenhof) and Mazdamme (Kleindammenhof) manors west of the present Damme Street, in the area of 130 and 142 Slokas Street. In 1838 Lieldamme manor was acquired by Juris Dumpis, a tenant of Kleistu manor.
- Schultzenhof (Schultzenhof), in the area of the present Cross Street, Mazas Bolderājas Street, Eduarda Šmita Street in Imanta
- Zolitude Manor (Solitüde, Swanenborgshof), also Bērzmuiža, between the present Tālavas gatvė and Zīļu street
- Zeibarts Manor (Seibarts Hof), at 126a Slokas Street
- Fokmuiža, also Bokaišu Manor, Hagenshof, Schwarzhof, Schwartzenhof, at present Bukaišu Street 2 in Katlakalns
- Kleistu Manor or Kleiste Manor (Kleistenhof, Kleissenhof), now 37 Kleistu Street
- Lāčupes New Manor (Nyhof) also Lambert Manor, near Kleistu Street
- Pleskodahl Manor (Pleskodahl), near 160 Kalnciema Street
- Champêtre Manor (Hof Champêtre), also Presting, Prestina, Landendorf, Ludekdorf Manor, south of Jurkalnes Street near Vecaines Street
- Essen Manor (Essenhof), also Lielā manor, Spilve Manor, Gothana Manor, Gutins Manor (Gothanshof, Drelings Hof) at the northern end of Dzirciema Street
- Blocksches Höfchen (1843), 27 Vienības gatve
- Hermannsruh (Hermannsruh), presumably at 78 Jelgavas Street, at the junction of Jelgavas Street and Bauskas Street. In 1797 the manor was bought by Gotthard Hermann Ramm, a senior member of the Great Guild.
- Altona Manor at 19 O. Vācieša Street. Originally built as the hotel "Jerusalem" near the mill of the Mara pond, later transformed into the Šrēdera Manor, now the Ojārs Vācieš Museum
- Ebelshof, Ziepniekkalns, Zaļenieku iela 21
