= Johann Gottfried Müthel =

German composer, organist and harpsichordist (1728 - 1788)

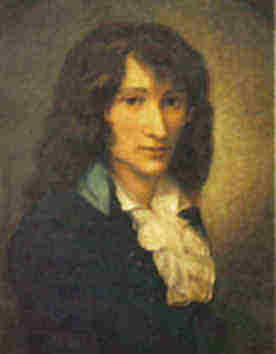
Johann Gottfried Müthel.

Johann Gottfried Müthel (January 17, 1728 – July 14, 1788) was a German composer and noted keyboard virtuoso. Along with C.P.E. Bach, he represented the Sturm und Drang style of composition.

As far as is known, he was the first to use the term fortepiano in a published work, in the title of his Duetto für 2 Clavier, 2 Flügel, oder 2 Fortepiano (1771), which reflects the rising popularity of the instrument at that time.

== Biography ==
He was born in Mölln in the Duchy of Lauenburg, the fifth of nine children. His father was Christian Caspar, an organist and friend of Georg Philipp Telemann. He studied music with his father, and later Johann Paul Kunzen in Lübeck. When only 19 years of age, he became a court organist and harpsichordist for Duke Christian Ludwig II of Mecklenburg-Schwerin, in Schwerin.

In 1750 he was given leave to become the student of Bach in Leipzig. He became Bach's last pupil, beginning study only three months before the master's death. In that time, he notated a number of the blind composer's final works, including parts of the Orgelbüchlein. According to Bach's biographer Philipp Spitta, he was present at Bach's deathbed, and took over his duties for nine weeks.

Subsequently, Müthel took lessons from Johann Christoph Altnickol, who had also been living and studying with Bach. Afterwards he spent a good deal of time on travel, and he met other composers, the most notable of whom was C.P.E. Bach (then residing at the court of Frederick II of Prussia at Potsdam), with whom he maintained a lifelong friendship and correspondence.

In 1751 Müthel returned to the ducal court, where he remained for two more years, eventually being replaced by his younger brother. Two years later he moved to Riga (now in Latvia, then part of the Russian Empire), where one of his brothers had moved. It was here that he published his first works, in 1756; most of his compositions remained in manuscript during his lifetime. At first he worked as a conductor for a private orchestra, before being appointed organist at St. Peter's Church, which he served from 1767 until 1788, when he died in nearby Bienenhof.

== Influence ==
Riga was far from the established musical centers of Europe; but despite this handicap, and the fact that he saw few of his pieces printed, he gained praise from several competent judges for his virtuosity. The English music historian Charles Burney, who mentioned him several times in his writings, held him in high esteem. The German Christian Friedrich Daniel Schubart wrote of his harpsichord skill that "connoisseurs that have heard him cannot praise enough the quickness, correctness and lightness with which he conquers mountains of difficulties." He is believed to have been a skilled improviser on the keyboard. His preference seems to have been for playing the clavichord.

== Compositions ==
Even now, some of the works which Müthel is known to have produced have not yet been released in modern editions. None of his pieces for organ achieved publication in his lifetime, nor were any for non-keyboard instruments.

=== For keyboard ===
His known works include a total of seven concerti, nine sonatas, and numerous other shorter pieces.

- Concerto for solo Harpsichord in B♭ major (printed 1767)
- Concerto for Harpsichord and strings in C minor (printed 1767)
- Concerto for Harpsichord and strings in D minor (printed 1767)
- Concerto for Harpsichord and strings in D major
- Concerto for Harpsichord and strings in G major
- Concerto for Harpsichord and strings in B♭ major
- Concerto for Harpsichord and strings in B♭ major (doubtful attribution)
- Sonata No. 1 in F major (printed in 1756)
- Sonata No. 2 in G major (printed in 1756)
- Sonata No. 3 in C major (printed in 1756)
- Duetto für 2 Clavier, 2 Flügel, oder 2 Fortepiano (printed in 1771)
- Duetto in E♭ major (printed in 1771)
- Arioso with 12 Variations, No. 1 in G major (printed in 1756)
- Arioso with 12 Variations, No. 2 in C minor (printed in 1756)
- 12 Variations for Clavichord
- Minuet with 6 variations
- Tempo di Minuetto con Variazioni
- Fantasy in F major for Organ
- Two Fantasies in E♭ major for Organ
- Fantasy in G minor for Organ
- Fantasy in G major for Organ

=== For voice ===
- 45 Choice Odes and Songs from Various Poets (45 Auserlesene Oden und Lieder von verschiedenen Dichtern) (printed in 1759)
- A cantata

=== For other instruments ===
- Concerto for Bassoon in C major
- Concerto for 2 Bassoons in E♭ major
- Sonata in D major for Flute and Basso Continuo

== Trivia ==
Müthel is greatly talked about in the short story "Early Music" by Jeffrey Eugenides.
