= Beberbeķi =

Neighbourhood of Riga, Latvia

- Neighbourhood
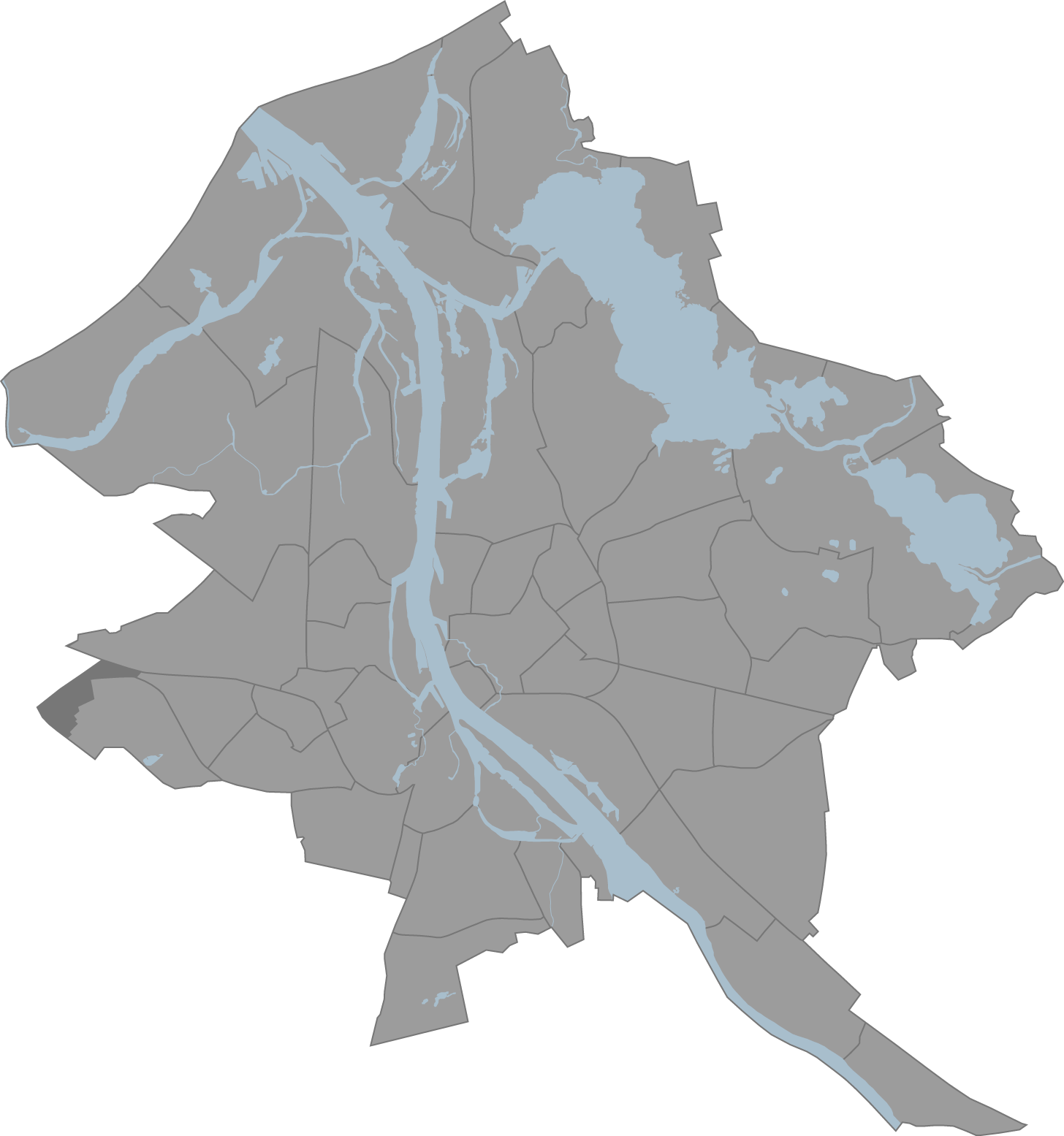
- Location of Beberbeķi in Riga
- Country: Latvia
- City: Riga
- District: Zemgale Suburb

Area
  - Total: 1.204 km^{2} (0.465 sq mi)

Population (2024)
  - Total: 571
  - Density: 474/km^{2} (1,230/sq mi)
- Website: apkaimes.lv

Beberbeķi is a neighbourhood consisting mainly of private houses which lies on the western edge of Riga, Latvia. The swampy forest in Mūķupurvs and the Rīga International Airport noise area divides it from the rest of the city. Within the neighborhood is Beberbeķi Park, which contains a small lake used as a beach and ice fishing.
