= Spilve =

Spilve may refer to:

- Spilve, Riga, a neighborhood in Riga, Latvia
- Spilve Airport, an airport in Riga, Latvia
