= Mūkupurvs =

Neighbourhood of Riga, Latvia

Coordinates: 56.9383°N 23.9808°E

- Neighbourhood of Riga
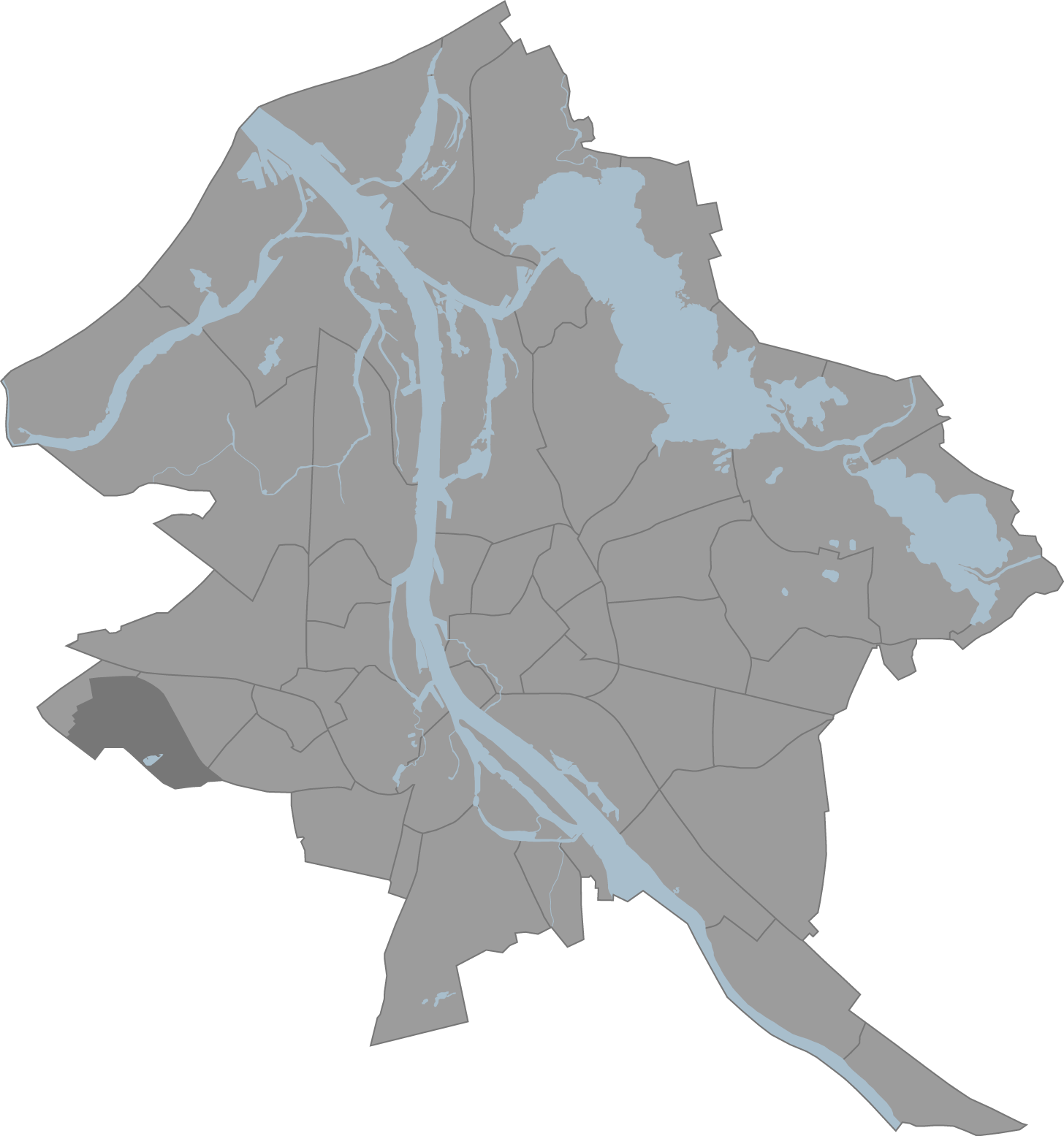
- Location of Mūkupurvs in Riga
- Country: Latvia
- City: Riga
- District: Zemgale Suburb

Area
  - Total: 4.515 km^{2} (1.743 sq mi)

Population (2024)
  - Total: 254
  - Density: 56.3/km^{2} (146/sq mi)
- Website: apkaimes.lv

Mūkupurvs is a neighborhood of the city of Riga, the capital city of Latvia and in Pārdaugava, a suburb of Zemgale. Mūkupurva neighborhood is located in the R part of Riga. It borders Beberbekai, Zolitūde and Pleskodāle neighborhoods, as well as Mārupe parish of Mārupe county, which is adjacent to the D part of Mūkupurva neighborhood. The boundaries of the Mūkupurva neighborhood are a line parallel to Beberbeķu line 5, Krotes iela, a line along the residential massif, the city boundary (Babītes iela, Kalnciema iela) and Kārļa Ulmanias gatve.

The total area of Mūkupurva neighborhood has a population of 242, and its area 4,515 km^{2}, which is only slightly less than the average area indicator of Riga neighborhoods. Currently, this neighborhood is a very underdeveloped area of Riga, but judging by its location and configuration, it can be created and function as a unified neighborhood in the future. Along the perimeter, the length of the boundary of Mūkupurva neighborhood is 10,293 meters. The D part of Mūkupurva neighborhood, which is also the border of the city of Riga, is adjacent to the territory of the Riga International Airport.
