= Šampēteris =

Neighbourhood of Riga, Latvia

Coordinates: 56.9419°N 24.0397°E

- Neighbourhood of Riga
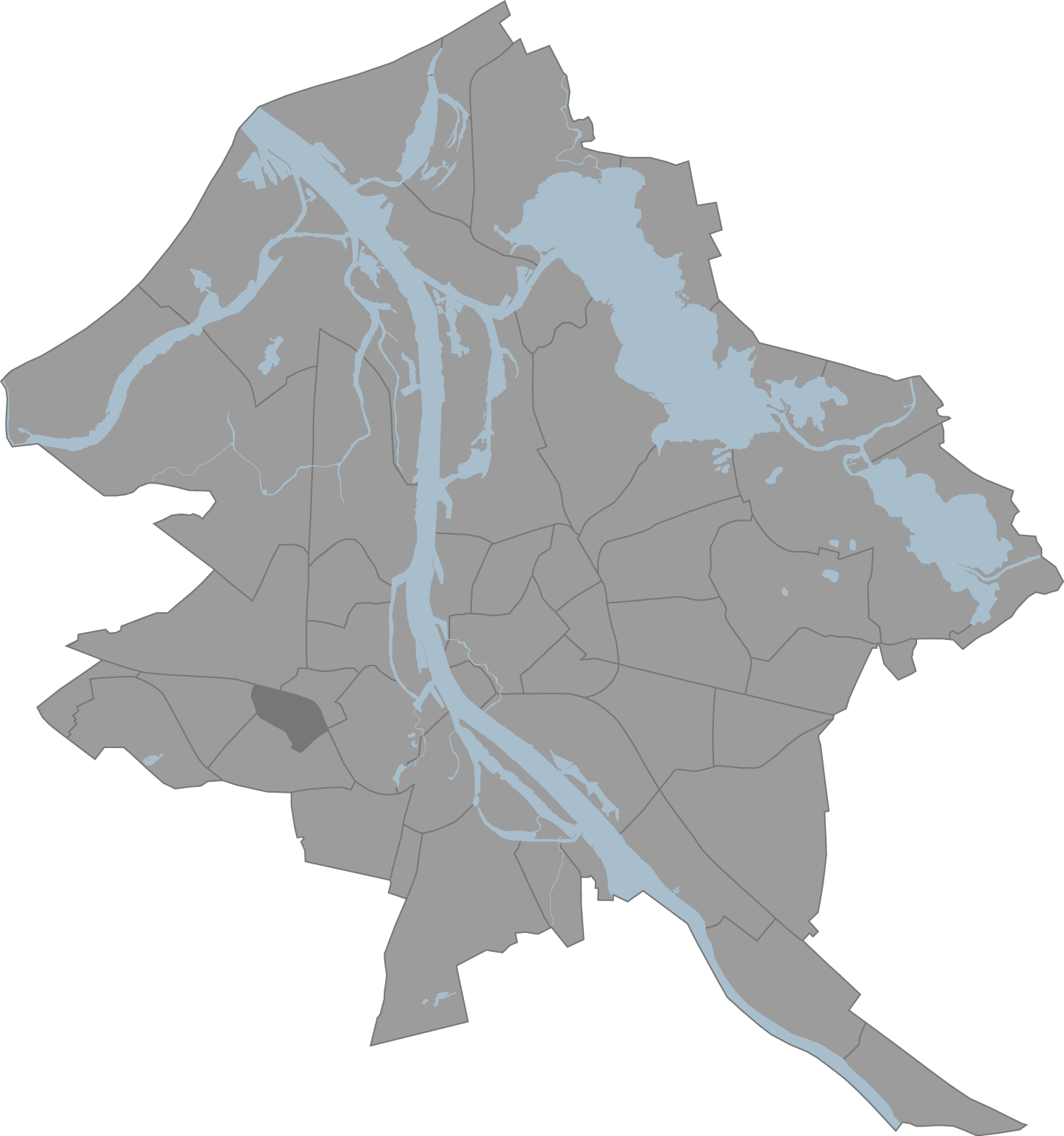
- Location of Šampēteris in Riga
- Country: Latvia
- City: Riga
- District: Zemgale Suburb

Area
  - Total: 1.366 km^{2} (0.527 sq mi)

Population (2024)
  - Total: 4,674
  - Density: 3,422/km^{2} (8,862/sq mi)
- Website: apkaimes.lv

Šampēteris is an old Riga neighbourhood on the Pārdaugava side of the Daugava river, with many houses built in the first part of 20th century still surviving.

== Etymology ==
The area's name comes from the French word champêtre, which means 'rural, pastoral'.
