= LMT (company) =

Company based in Riga, Latvia

- Native name: Latvijas Mobilais Telefons
- Industry: GSM/UMTS/LTE operator
- Founded: January 2, 1992; 34 years ago
- Headquarters: Riga, Latvia
- Area served: Latvia
- Revenue: 175,061,607 euro (2023)
- Net income: 34,863,553 euro (2023)
- Total assets: 352,739,522 euro (2023)
- Owner: The Republic of Latvia (51%); Telia Company AB (49%)
- Number of employees: 733 (2023)
- Website: lmt.lv

LMT (Latvian: Latvijas Mobilais Telefons, 'Latvian Mobile Telephone') is a mobile GSM/UMTS/LTE operator in Latvia.

Logo used until March 2013

== History ==
LMT was founded on January 2, 1992. It was the first mobile network operator in the country and established itself as an operator for the NMT system, but in January 1995 it started operating a GSM network alongside the existing NMT network. Based on market research, it requested for its license to be expanded to permit the use of the 1800 MHz range, which was allowed in the summer of 1999. On December 1, 1999, there were 14 active GSM 900/1800 base stations, with the plan to have 11 more operational before the end of the millennium.

LMT announced on April 3, 2000 that it was partnering with Hansabank to release the first ever mobile banking solution in the country. It allowed the user to, for example, look up currency rates, check the account balance, see the transactions done on the account and receive text messages notifying about actions done on the account. The account holder was able to choose how often those notifications should arrive with the options ranging from monthly up to after each action takes place. It was also noted right away that there are plans to provide a method for making payments via mobile banking as that was not initially possible saying that this marks the start of a new generation of services.

In November 2000, LMT started a prepaid service called OKarte (OCard) along their existing subscription based service. The cooperation with Hansabank was continued by allowing the prepaid accounts to be instantly refilled from any Hansabank ATM. On October 7, 2013, the prepaid service was merged with the LMT branding and renamed to LMT Okarte.

LMT announced in January 2002 that it will stop supporting the NMT network at the end of the year and started rolling out GPRS later that year, providing GPRS everywhere in Latvia by September 2002. Following the expansion, LMT announced the support for MMS on March 31, 2003. After acquiring the licence, the initial release of the commercial UMTS network was in December 2004. Soon after that, in June 2005, EDGE was introduced in Riga and Jūrmala by LMT and the HSDPA rollout started in August 2006.

In cooperation with TeliaSonera, LMT started selling the iPhone in Latvia on September 26, 2008.

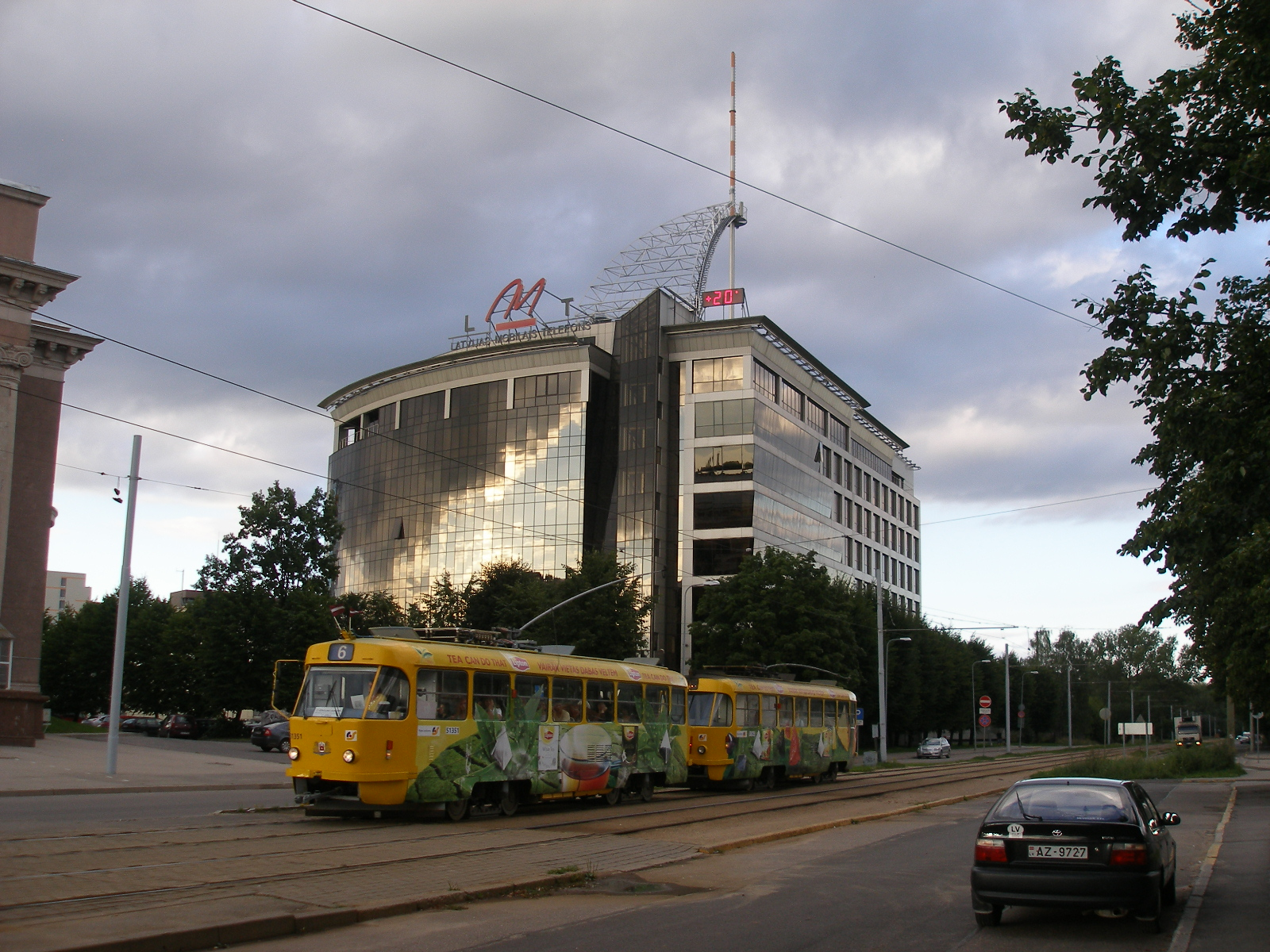
The LMT headquarters in Ropažu iela, Riga

The LTE network was commercially released on May 31, 2011, but was not made available to phone users initially. The first citywide coverage of the network in Latvia was in Liepāja in July 2012 and following further network development, LTE was made available to phone users on November 5, 2013, without any additional charges. As of April 2014, 50% of Latvians had access to the LTE network with the future goal of providing it in the whole territory of Latvia, including rural areas, by 2016.

In April 2013, LMT started the project ‘LMT for Latvia’ (LMT Latvijai in Latvian) – a comprehensive and nationwide CSR project, in cooperation with local municipalities and locals of different Latvian towns and cities. New children’s playground and modernized library in Preiļi, outdoor fitness equipment in Tukums, purchase of binoculars for bird watching in Sātiņi Nature Reserve and a youth festival in Saldus are few of the ideas implemented in 2014 thanks to the initiative ‘LMT for Latvia’. The ultimate goal of the project is to improve the life and environment of Latvian regional communities and support the initiatives of the individuals, companies and various NGOs in order to achieve growth of the city/town and make life better and surroundings – more beautiful. In 2014, 88 ideas were submitted in eight Latvian cities and towns, 32 were chosen for the implementation. More than 28 000 people participated in the voting and the initiative was covered in more than 200 press cuttings. The winners of the competition received 500 to 2000 euro funding or co-financing. In total, LMT donated 64 thousand euro for the project in 2014. The project has greatly improved the local communities, as well as helped establish excellent cooperation with the local municipalities, that has improved the relations and business results in the specific towns.

As of June 2014 LMT had roaming agreements for voice calling and text messaging services with 446 operators in 204 countries in Europe, Africa, Asia, Oceania and America also including ships and satellite communication networks while mobile internet services were available in 372 operator networks in 171 country.

LMT is now the largest telecommunications service provider, in the beginning of year 2015 serving 1 113 197 clients, which is 30 thousand more than the year before.

On June 1, 2021, it was announced that SIA "Latvijas mobilais telefons" will purchase the data transmission network and IT security solutions company SIA Santa Monica Networks, which also operated in Lithuania. Until then, the owners of SIA Santa Monica Networks were the limited partnership KS EuVECA Livonia Partners Fund I (51.89%), SIA C 3 (34.68%), the Estonian company Alkonda OÜ (11.64%) and several natural persons. After receiving permission from the Competition Council of Latvia and Lithuania, LMT completed the acquisition of Santa Monica Networks on October 11. In several rounds of 700 MHz frequency auctions held in Latvia in December 2021, LMT acquired 700 MHz frequency bands for 5.758 million euros.

On July 15, 2025, Government of Latvia announced that they plan to buy out Telia Company's shares of both LMT and Tet with help from Latvenergo and Latvian State Radio and Television Centre (LVRTC), to make both companies state-owned. Telia confirmed the sale on July 17 by signing a memorandum of understanding with Latvia, Latvenergo and LVRTC, with the transaction expected to be completed in the first half of 2026.

== Main products ==
While subscription based telephone services are the most prominent product of LMT, prepaid plans (LMT Karte) are also provided, along with a variety of data plans aimed at tablets and computers. As of June 2014, three mobile internet tiers are available for whole households consisting of unlimited data, with the top tier not imposing any arbitrary speed restrictions for the transfer.

== Events ==
LMT has been a major sponsor of the LMT Smart Future Conference since 2016. The conference purports to bring “experts across multiple industries and disciplines” to the VEF Kultūras pils in Riga each year.

Speakers have included former Culture Minister Dace Melbarde, journalist Ilze Jaunalksne and Emojipedia founder Jeremy Burge.

=== Patron of the University of Latvia ===
LMT is a silver patron of the University of Latvia Foundation. The company has been supporting the University of Latvia since 2007 by donating to exact sciences projects and providing conferences and forums. The direction of support is research and development of the learning environment.

== See also ==
- Telia Company (the main shareholder of LMT)
- Tele2
