= Bišumuiža =

Neighbourhood of Riga, Latvia

Coordinates: 56.9097°N 24.1361°E

- Neighbourhood of Riga
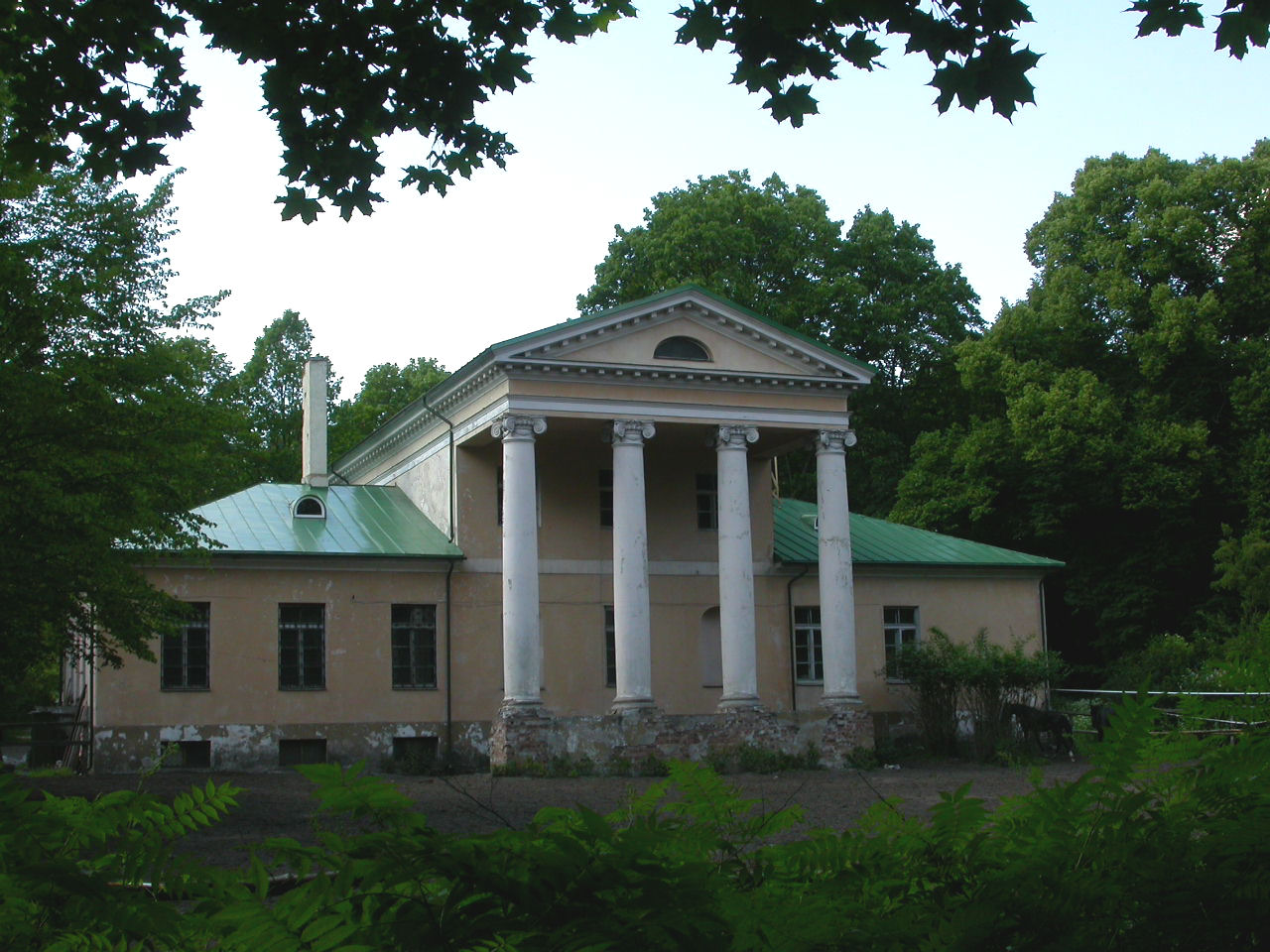
- Bišumuiža Manor estate

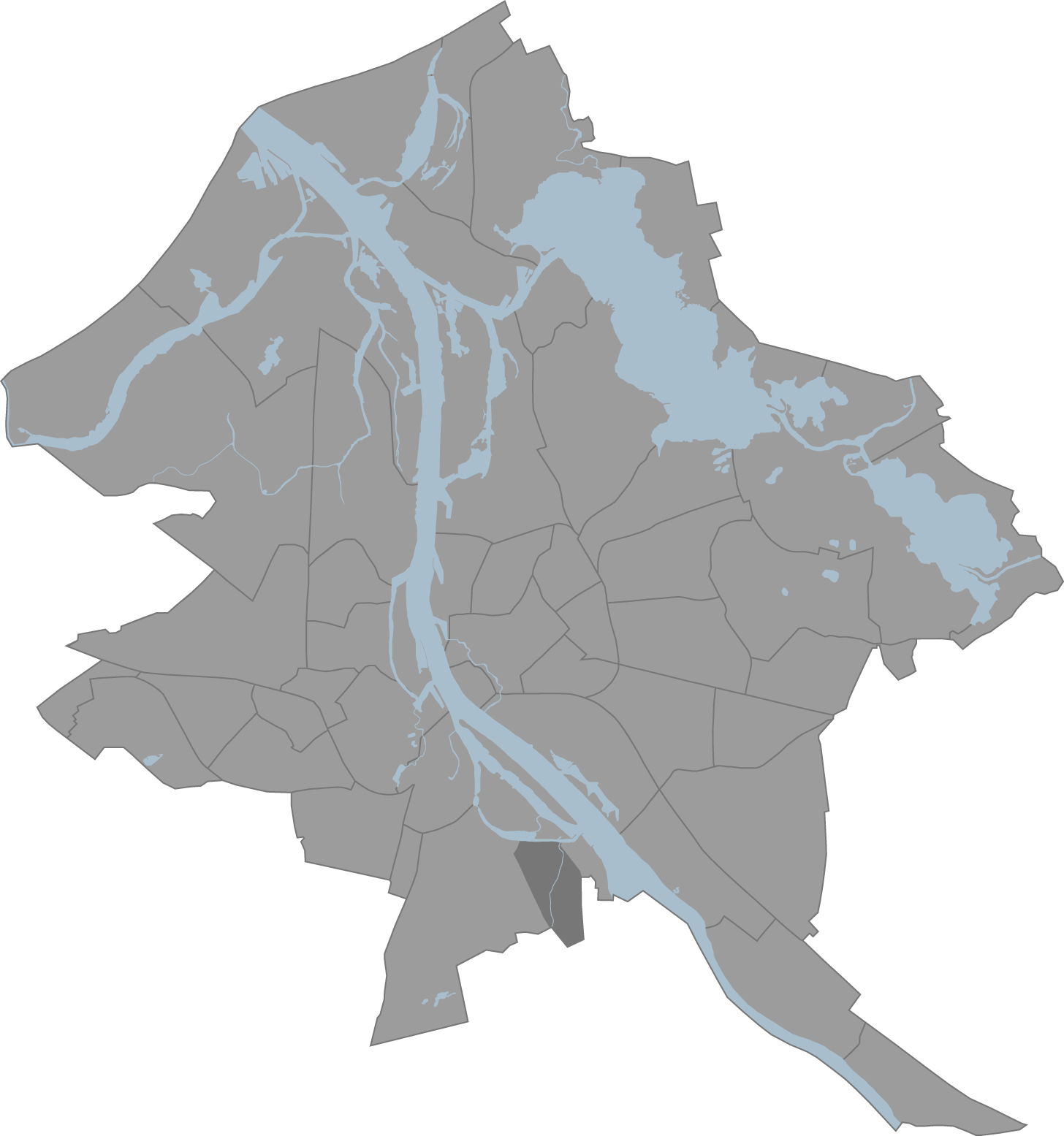
- Location of Bišumuiža in Riga
- Country: Latvia
- City: Riga
- District: Zemgale Suburb

Area
  - Total: 2.243 km^{2} (0.866 sq mi)

Population (2024)
  - Total: 2,640
  - Density: 1,180/km^{2} (3,050/sq mi)
- Website: apkaimes.lv

Bišumuiža (German: Bienenhof) is a neighbourhood of Zemgale Suburb in Riga, the capital of Latvia.
