= Bieriņi =

Neighbourhood of Riga, Latvia

- Neighbourhood of Riga
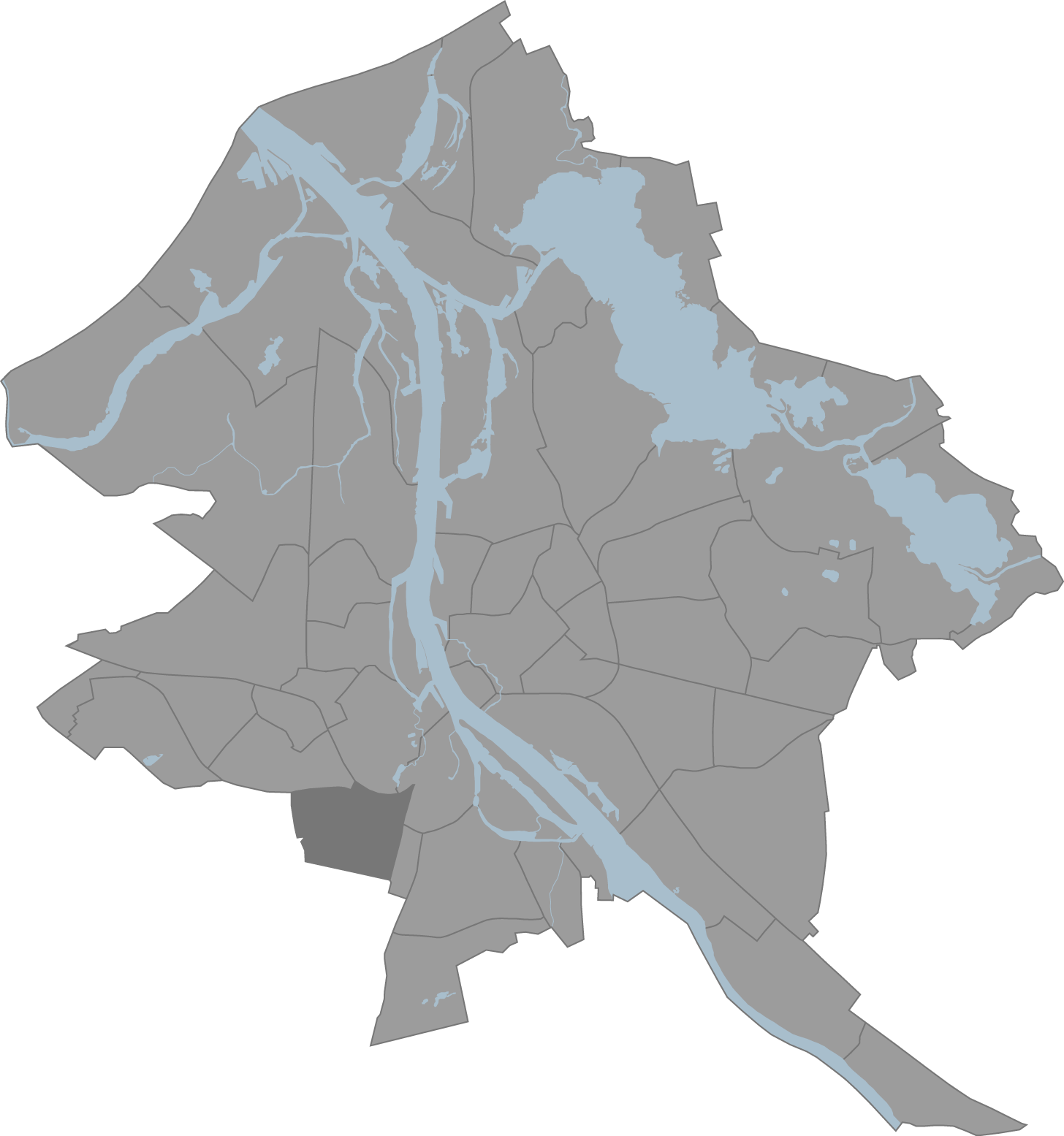
- Location of Bieriņi in Riga

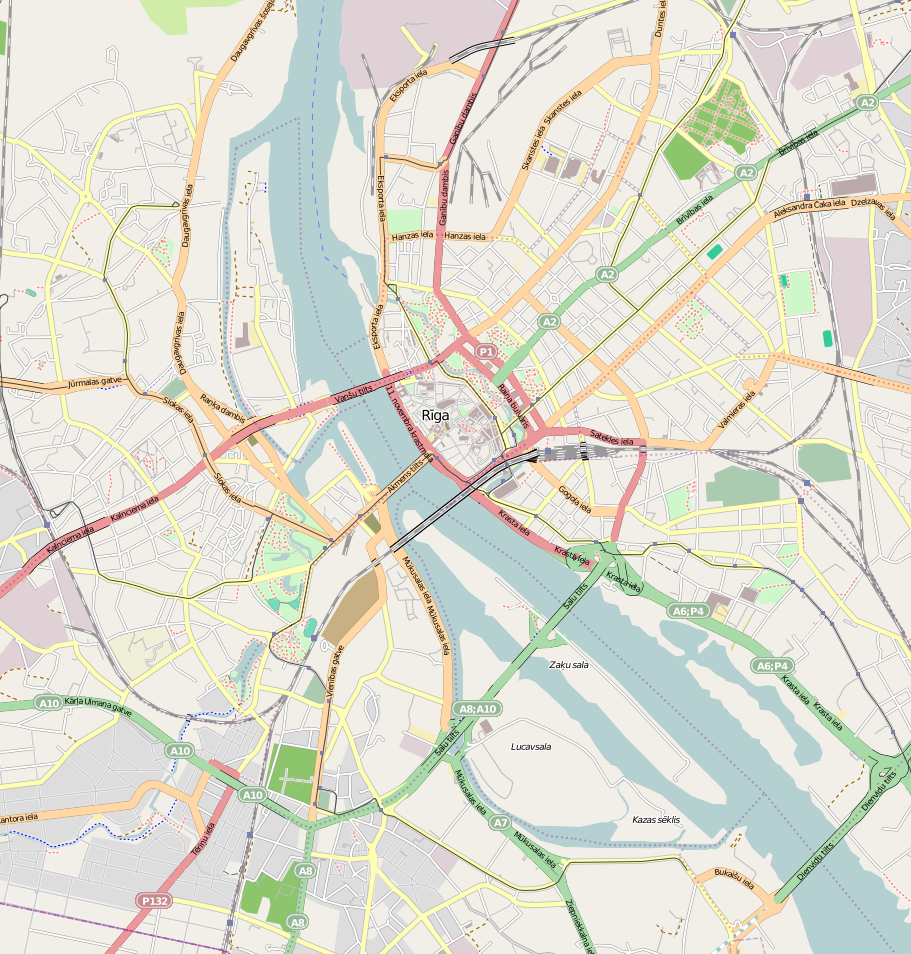
- Location within Riga
- Coordinates: 56°55′11″N 24°03′31″E
- Country: Latvia
- City: Riga
- District: Zemgale Suburb

Area
  - Total: 4.274 km^{2} (1.650 sq mi)

Population (2024)
  - Total: 7,695
  - Density: 1,800/km^{2} (4,663/sq mi)
- Time zone: UTC+2 (Eastern European Time)
- Website: www.bierinustasti.lv www.marupite.lv apkaimes.lv

Bieriņi is a neighbourhood of Zemgale Suburb, Riga, the capital of Latvia. This neighborhood also borders the town Mārupe.

== See also ==
- Bieriņu Manor
