= Avoti =

Neighbourhood of Riga, Latvia

- Neighbourhood
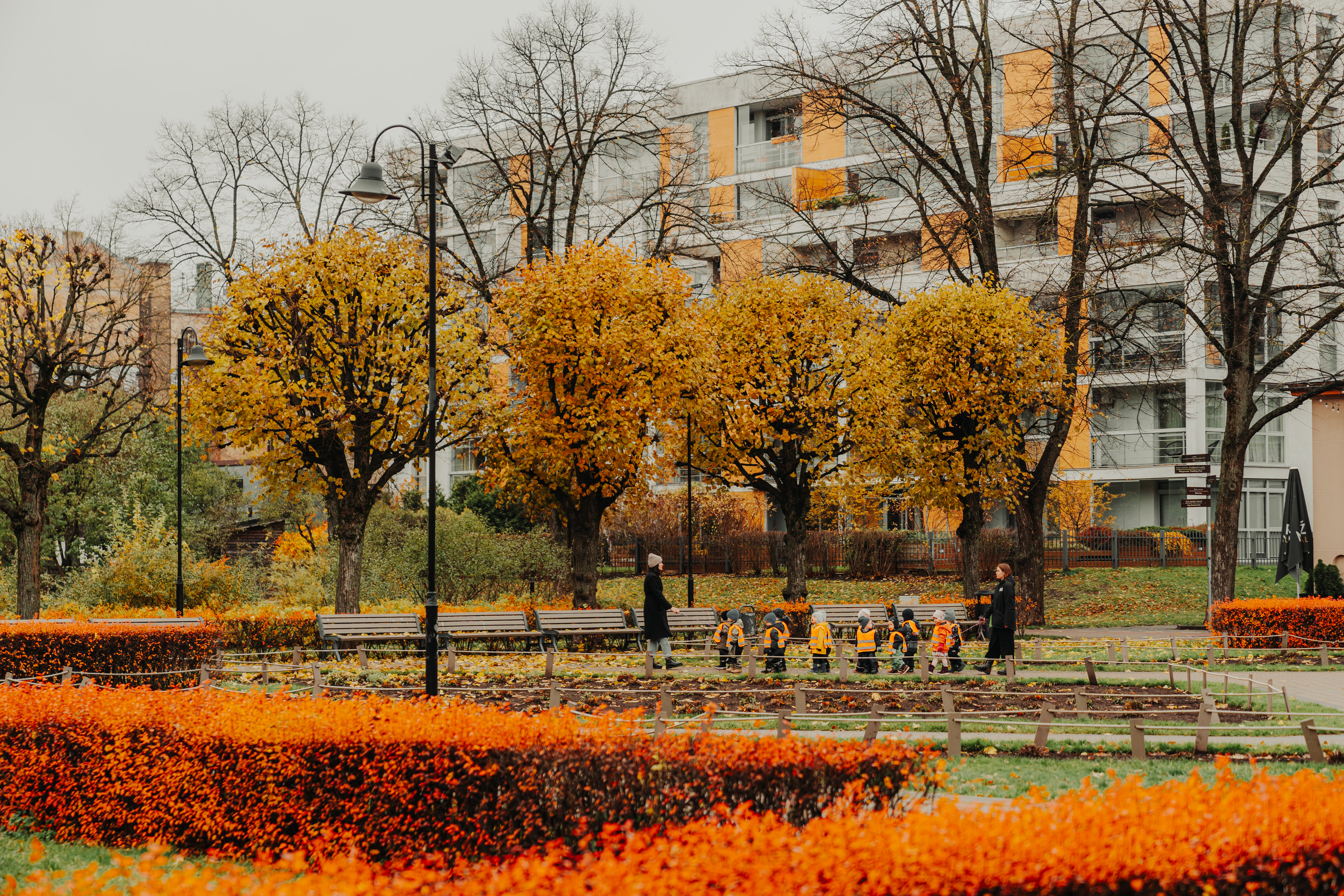
- Ziedoņdārzs park

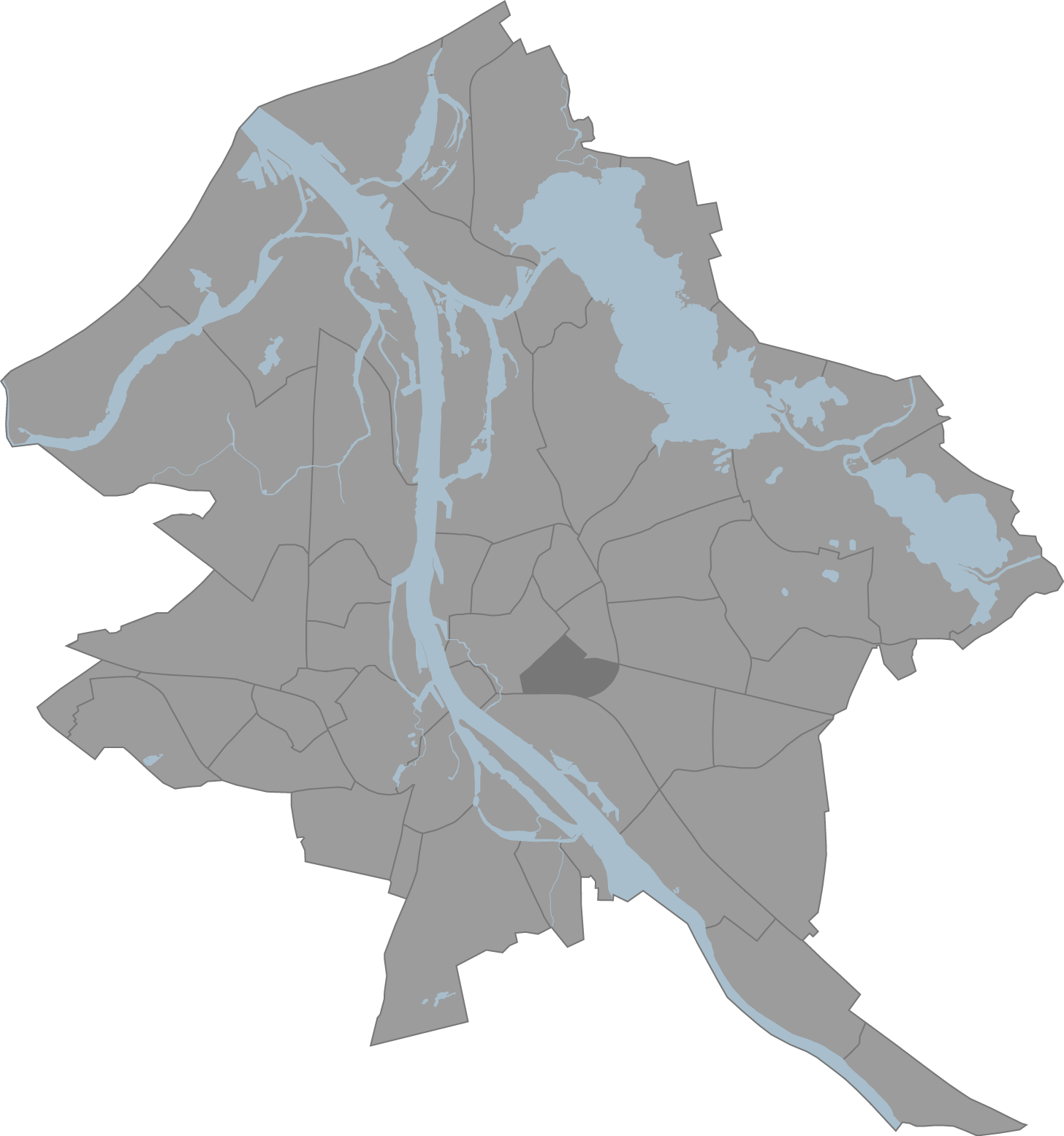
- Location of Avoti in Riga
- Country: Latvia
- City: Riga
- District: Latgale Suburb

Area
  - Total: 1.815 km^{2} (0.701 sq mi)

Population (2017)
  - Total: 20,658
  - Density: 11,380/km^{2} (29,480/sq mi)
- Postal code: LV-1050
- Website: apkaimes.lv

Avoti (commonly known as Avotu iela) is a neighbourhood of Riga, the capital of Latvia. It is named after Avotu iela (Avotu Street) which runs horizontally through the middle of the area.
