= Purvciems =

Neighborhood of Riga, Latvia

Coordinates: 56°57′N 24°10′E

- Neighborhood of Riga
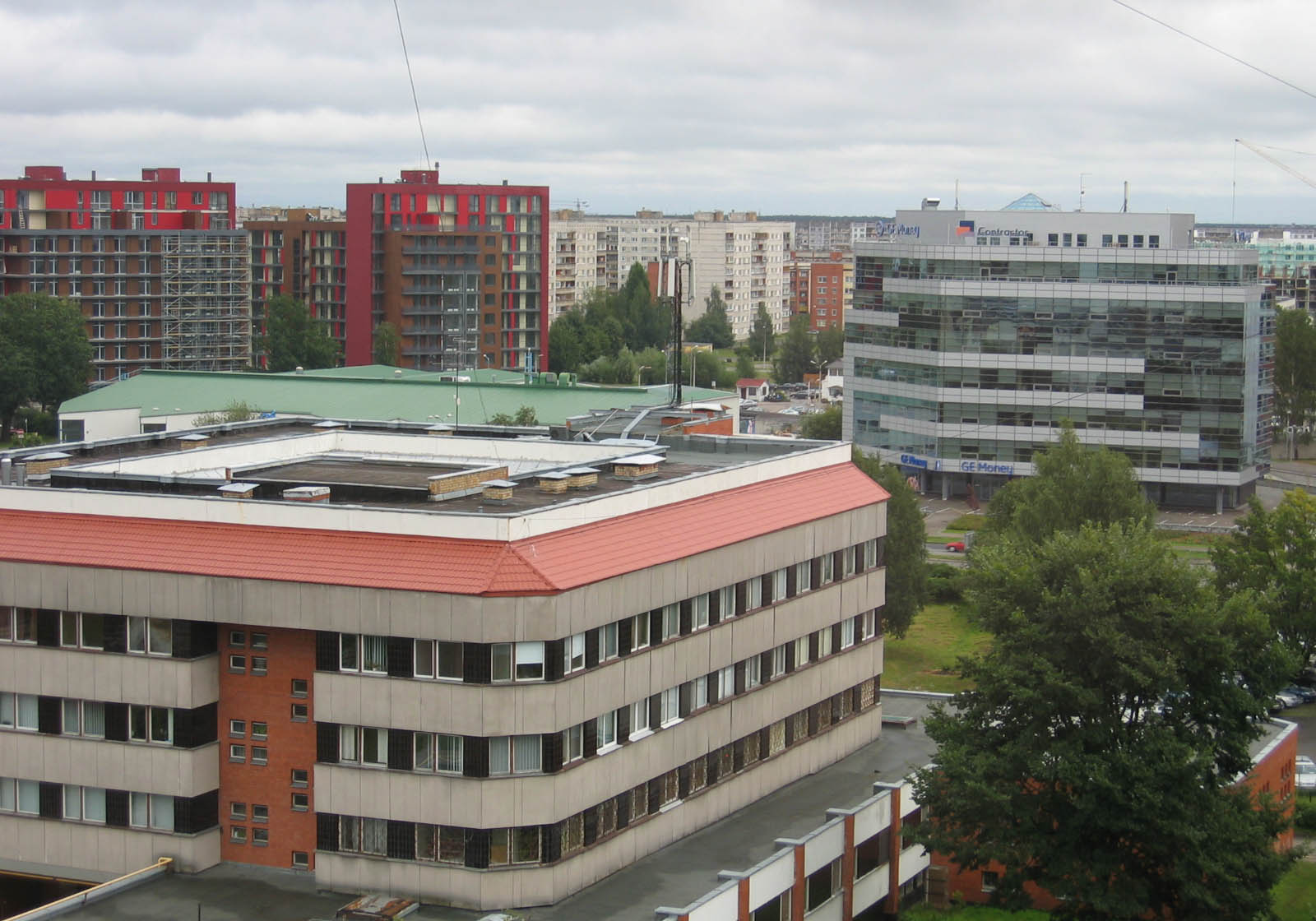
- Purvciems skyline

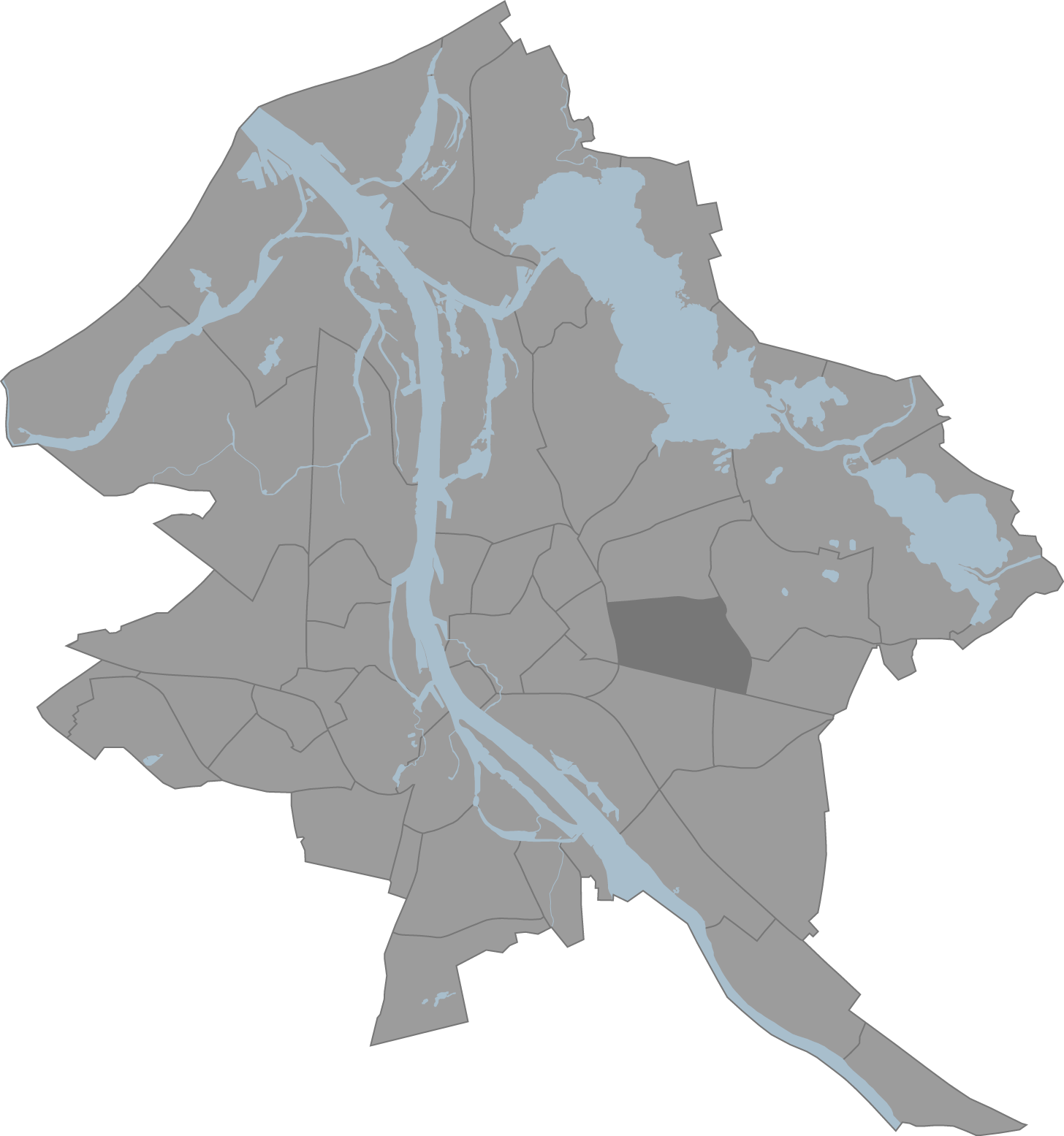
- Location in Riga
- Country: Latvia
- City: Riga
- District: Vidzeme Suburb

Area
  - Total: 5.017 km^{2} (1.937 sq mi)

Population (2017)
  - Total: 62,036
  - Density: 12,370/km^{2} (32,030/sq mi)
- Time zone: UTC+2 (EET)
  - Summer (DST): UTC+3 (EEST)
- Website: apkaimes.lv

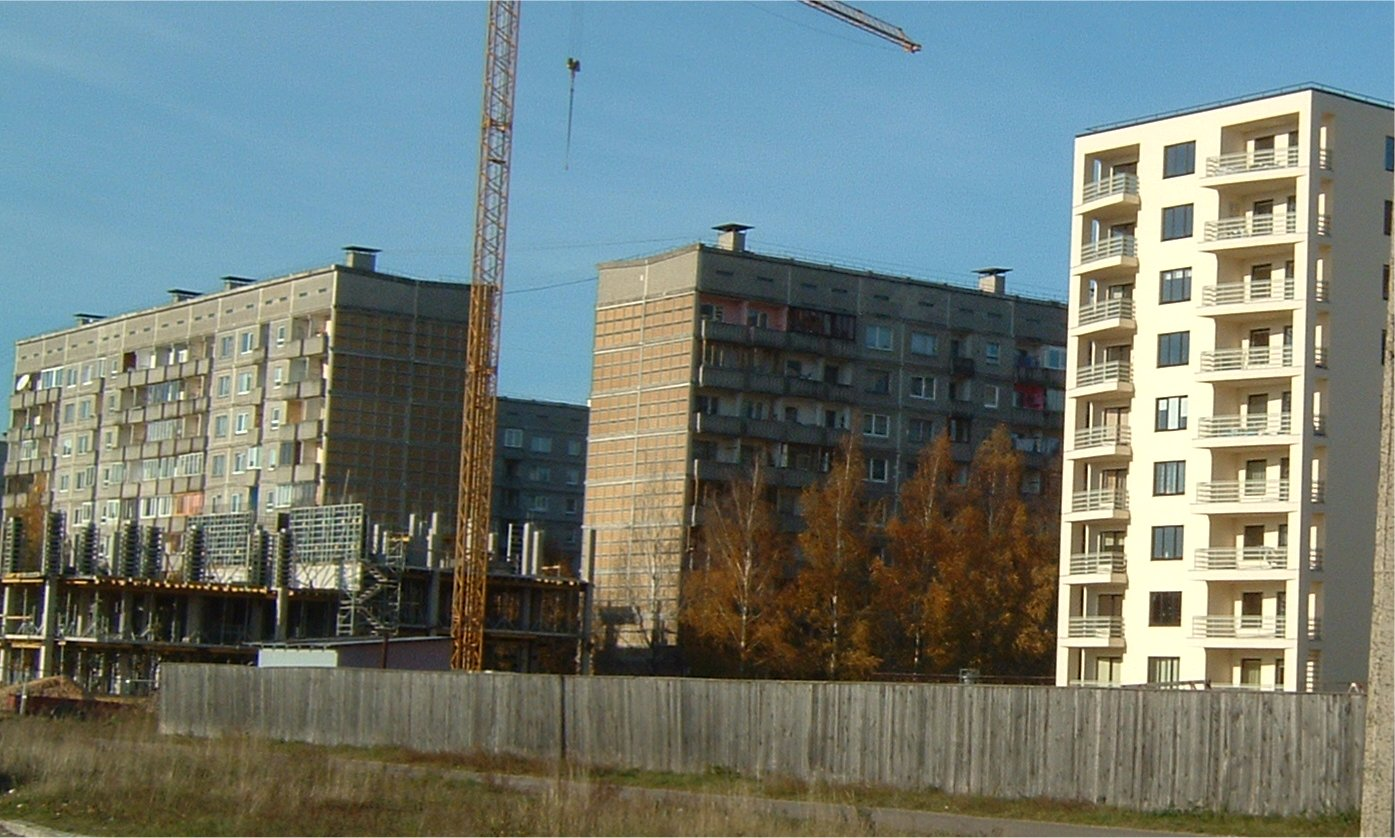
Typical soviet and post-Soviet apartment blocks in Purvciems

Purvciems is a neighbourhood in the Vidzeme Suburb of Riga, Latvia. Its name literally translates as "marsh village". It is located on the east bank of the River Daugava, to the east of the City Centre and is defined roughly as the area between A. Deglava Iela and Ieriķu Iela. The area is characterised by apartment blocks from the late Soviet and the first years after the restoration of Latvian independence (1980s–1990s), though there is also some detached housing. The district is Latvian and Russian-speaking.

== History ==
Starting the end of 17th century and start of 18th century, the largely unsurveyed territory was called Hausmaņa purvs ('Hausmanis' swamp/marsh'). Until the 19th century, only yeomen lived there. In 1828, the first part of the region was included in Riga's borders, and the area saw rise in single-family house construction. The second part of the region was included in Riga's borders in 1924, when a regional development plan and road construction led to rise in family home construction. The territory remained primarily for single homes until 1963–4. In 1965, the Purvciems housing block plan was conceived, that led to extensive high-rise building throughout 1970–80s. Purvciems together with Pļavnieki is one of the most densely inhabited neighbourhoods of Riga.

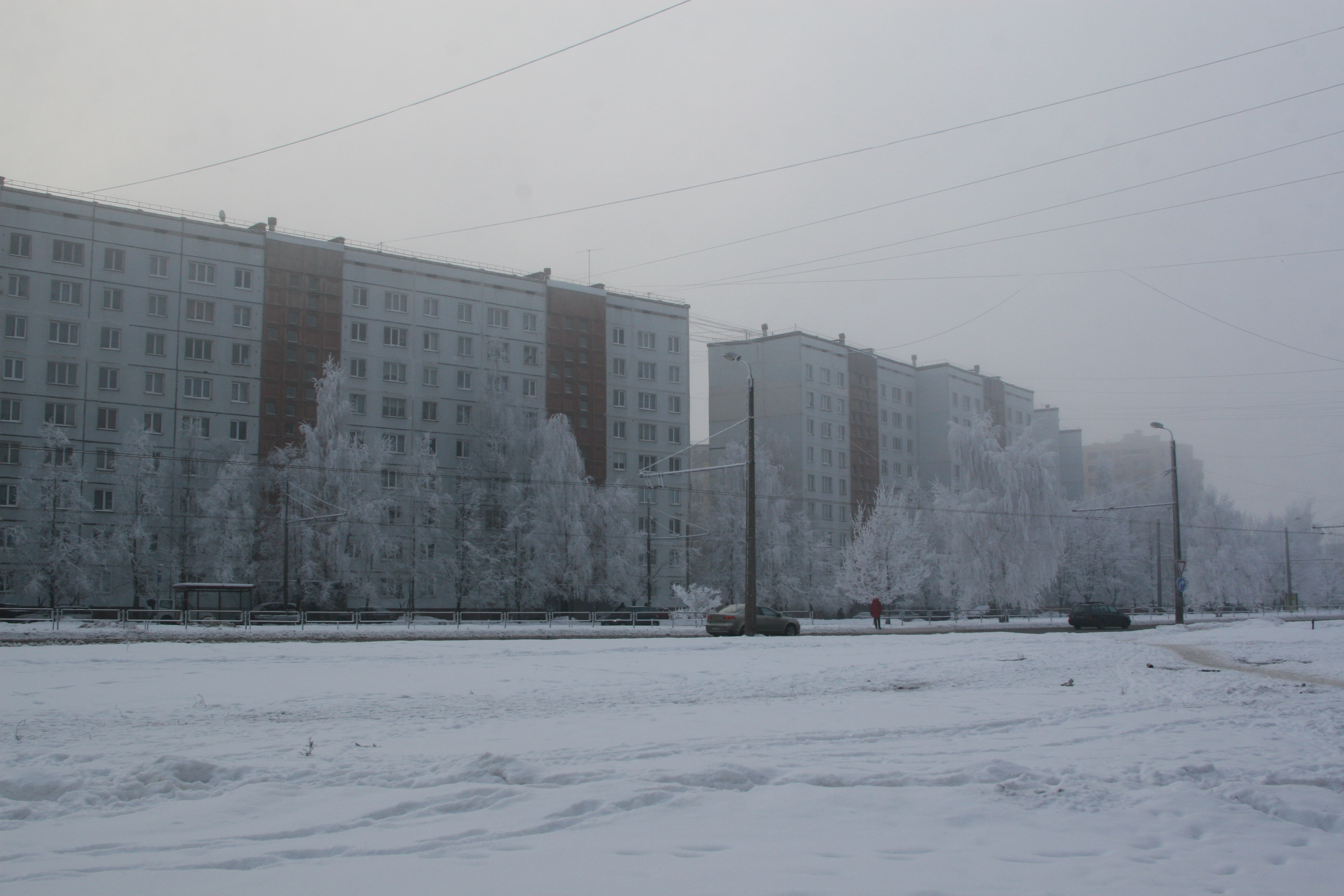
602 series apartment blocks along the Dzelzavas iela

In 2007, the 24-story AstraLux residential high-rise was completed, which is 81 meters high and is the tallest residential building on the right bank of the Daugava River.

== Infrastructure ==
Purvciems borders the Riga–Lugaži railway line (Zemitāni station).

== Gallery ==
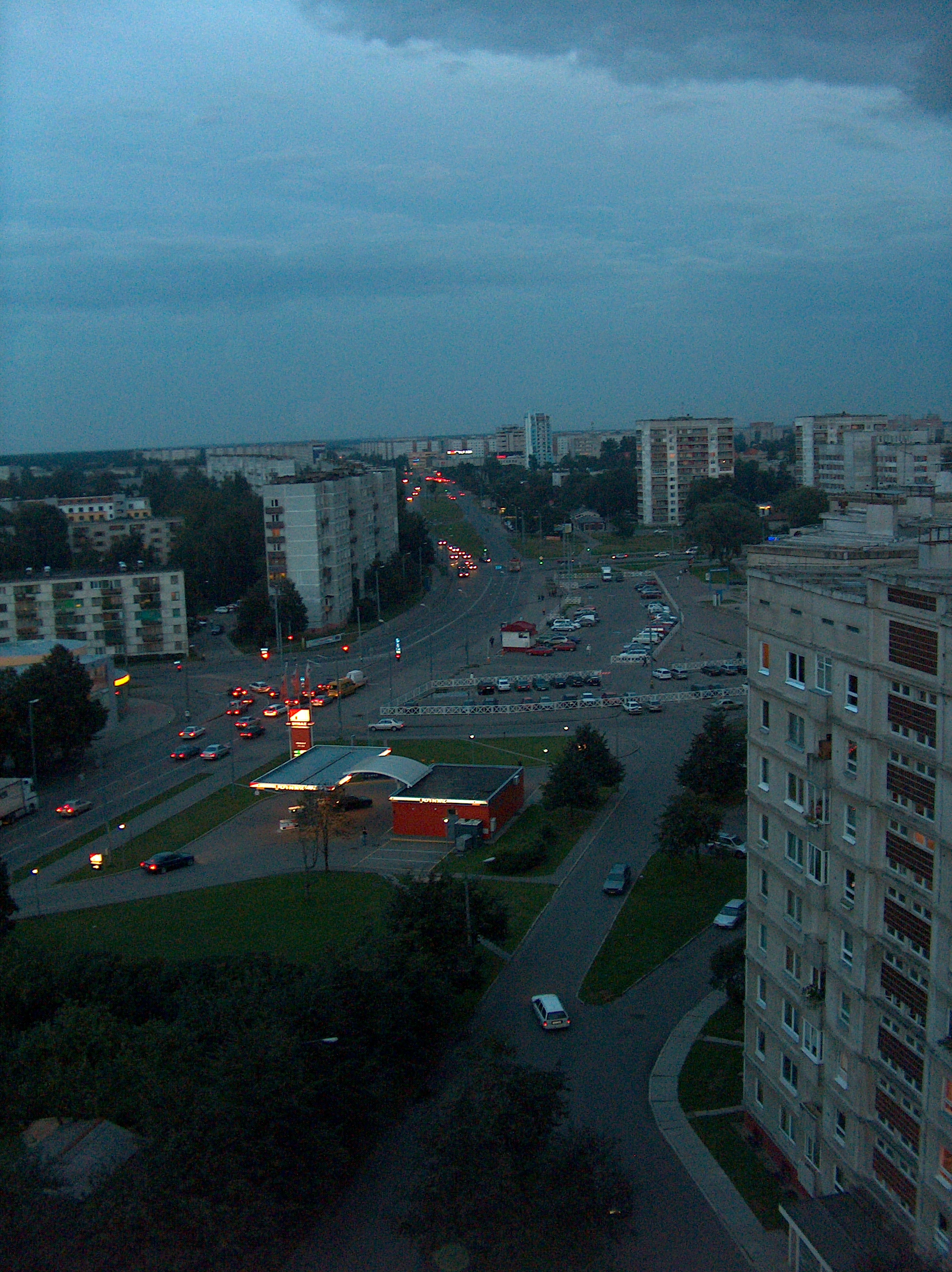
View of the intersection at the Minsk shopping mall in 2004

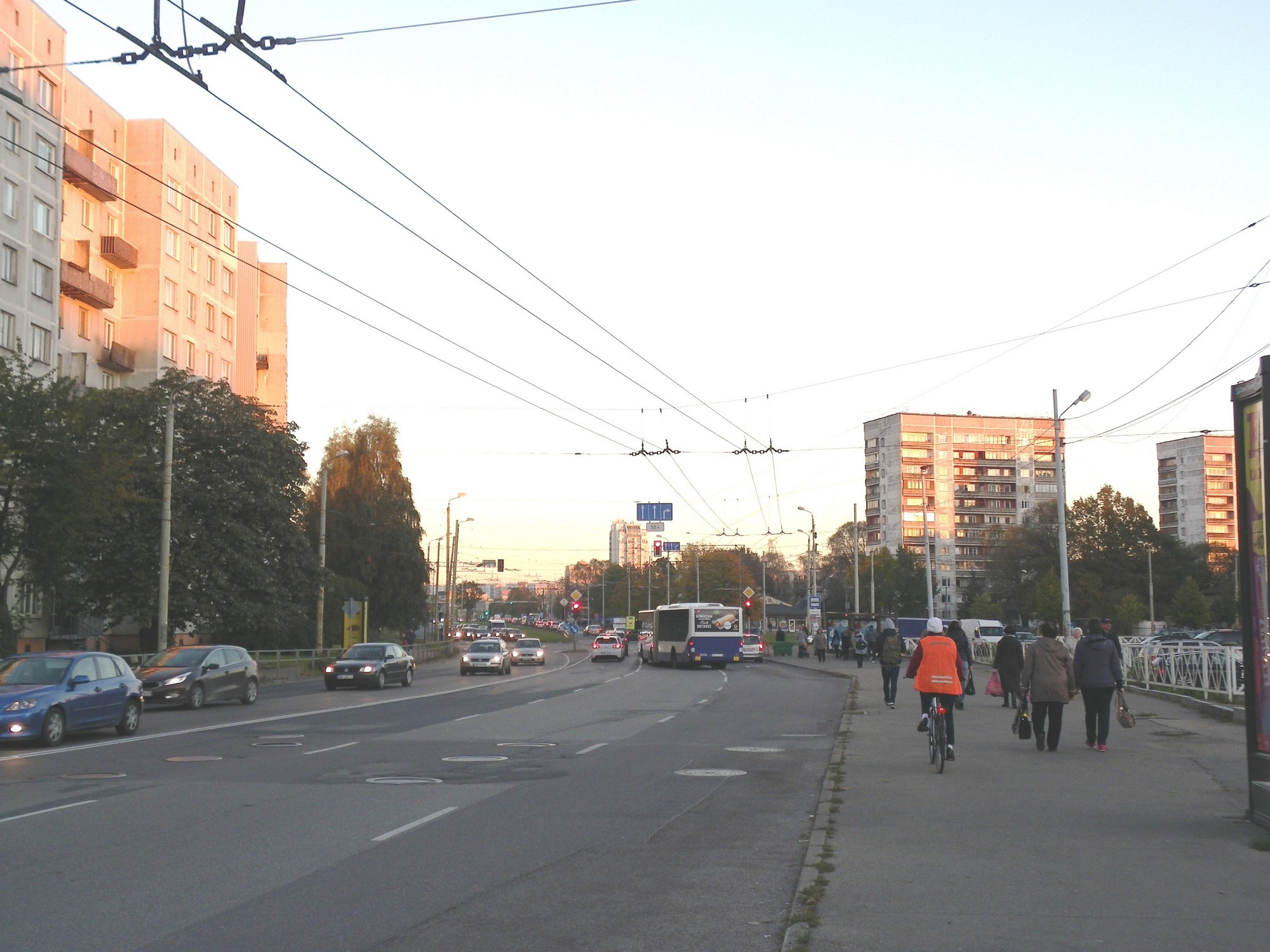
View to the east next to the shopping center "Minska"

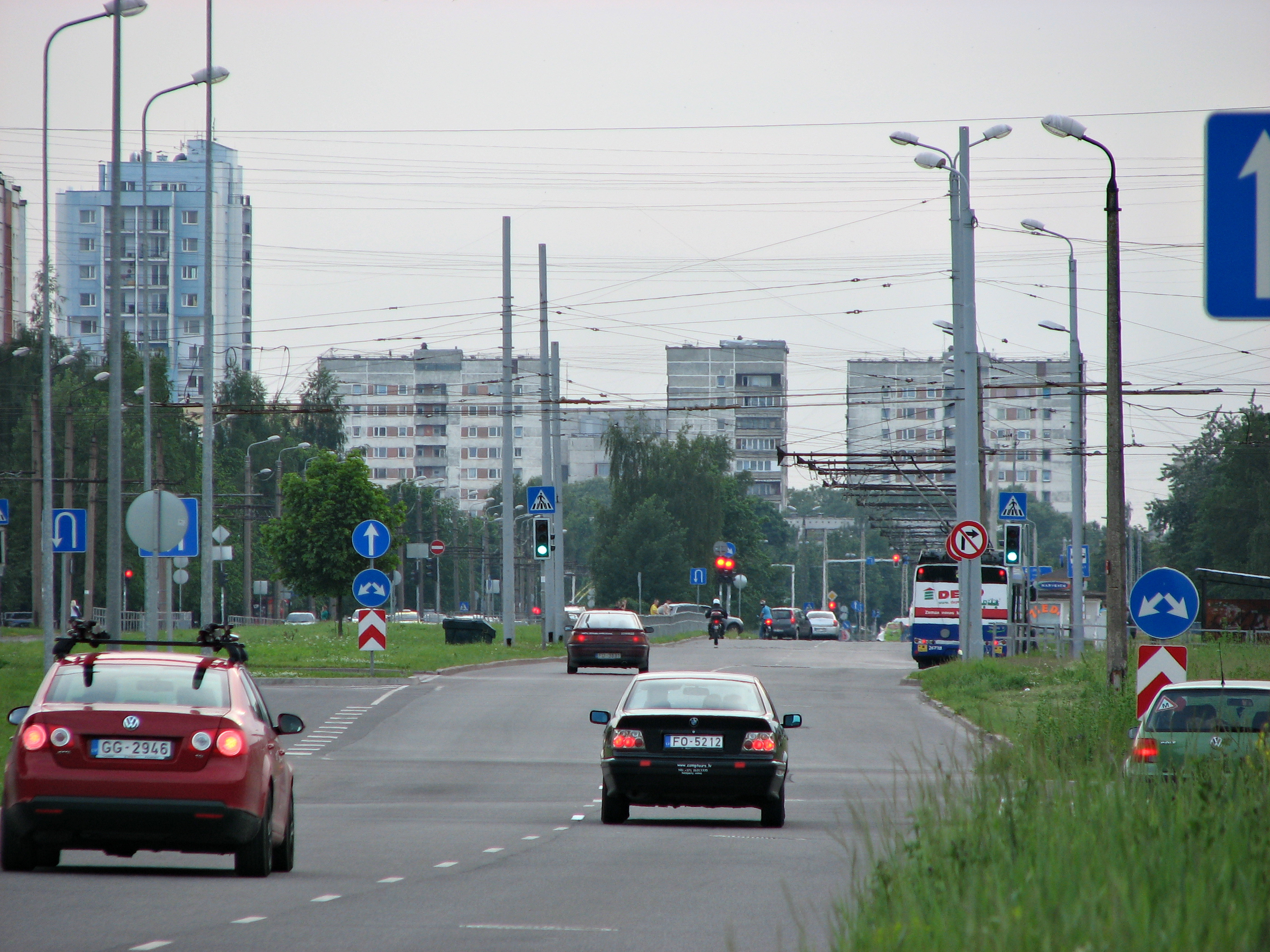
View to the west between Lielvārdes and Stigu streets

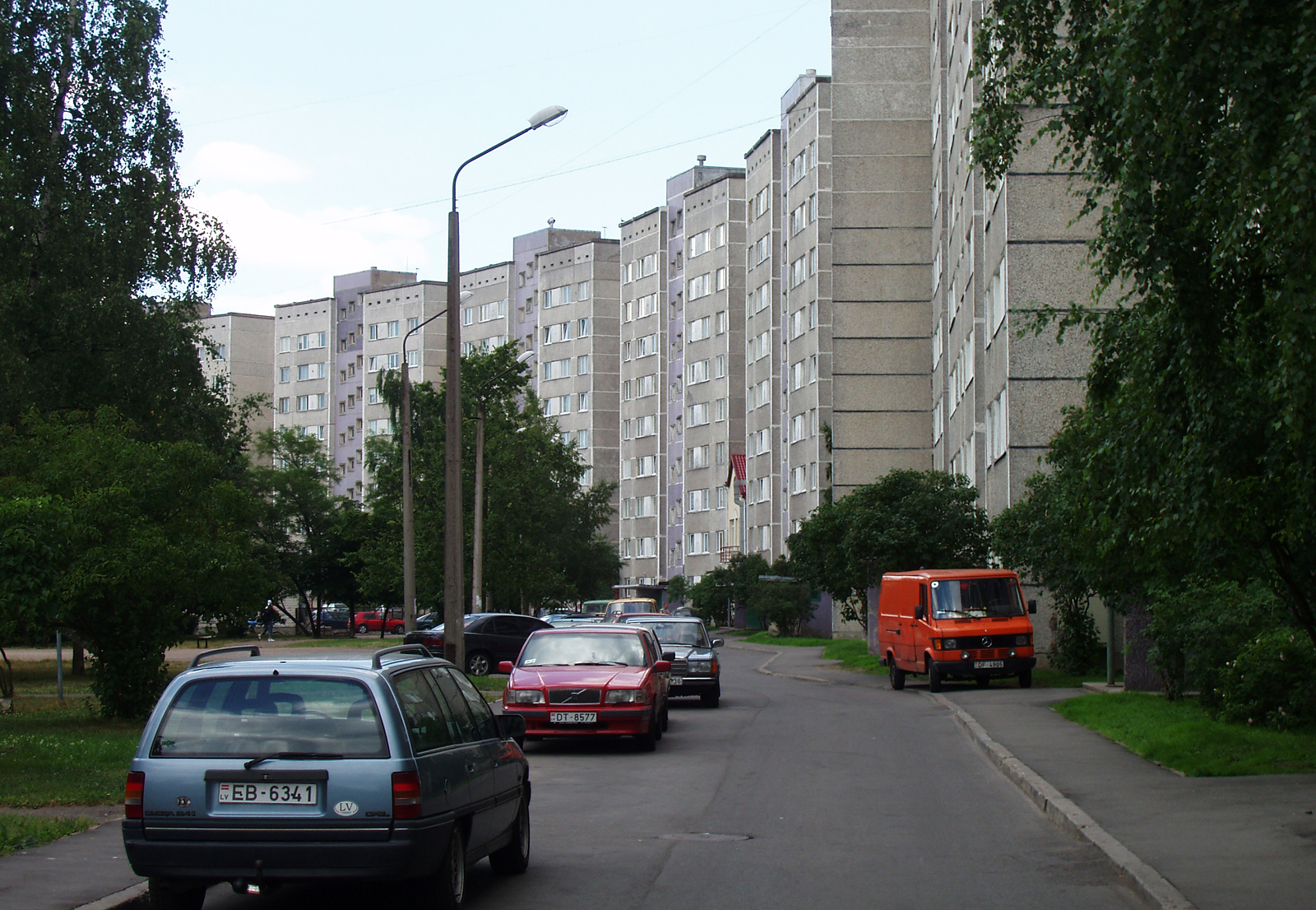
Inner yards of Purvciems apartment blocks in 2005
