= Zolitūde =

Neighborhood of Riga, Latvia

Coordinates: 56°56′49″N 24°00′39.5″E

- Neighborhood of Riga
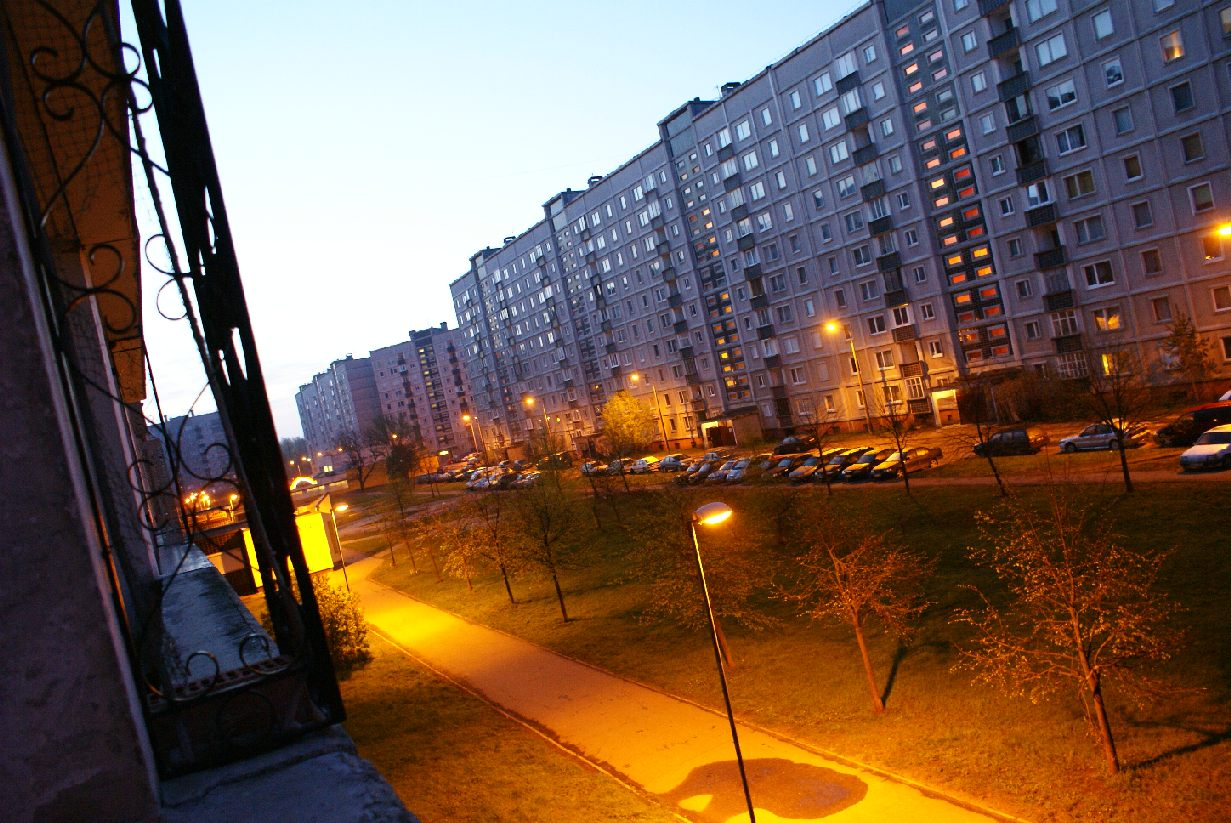
- Aleksandra Bieziņa Street in Zolitūde

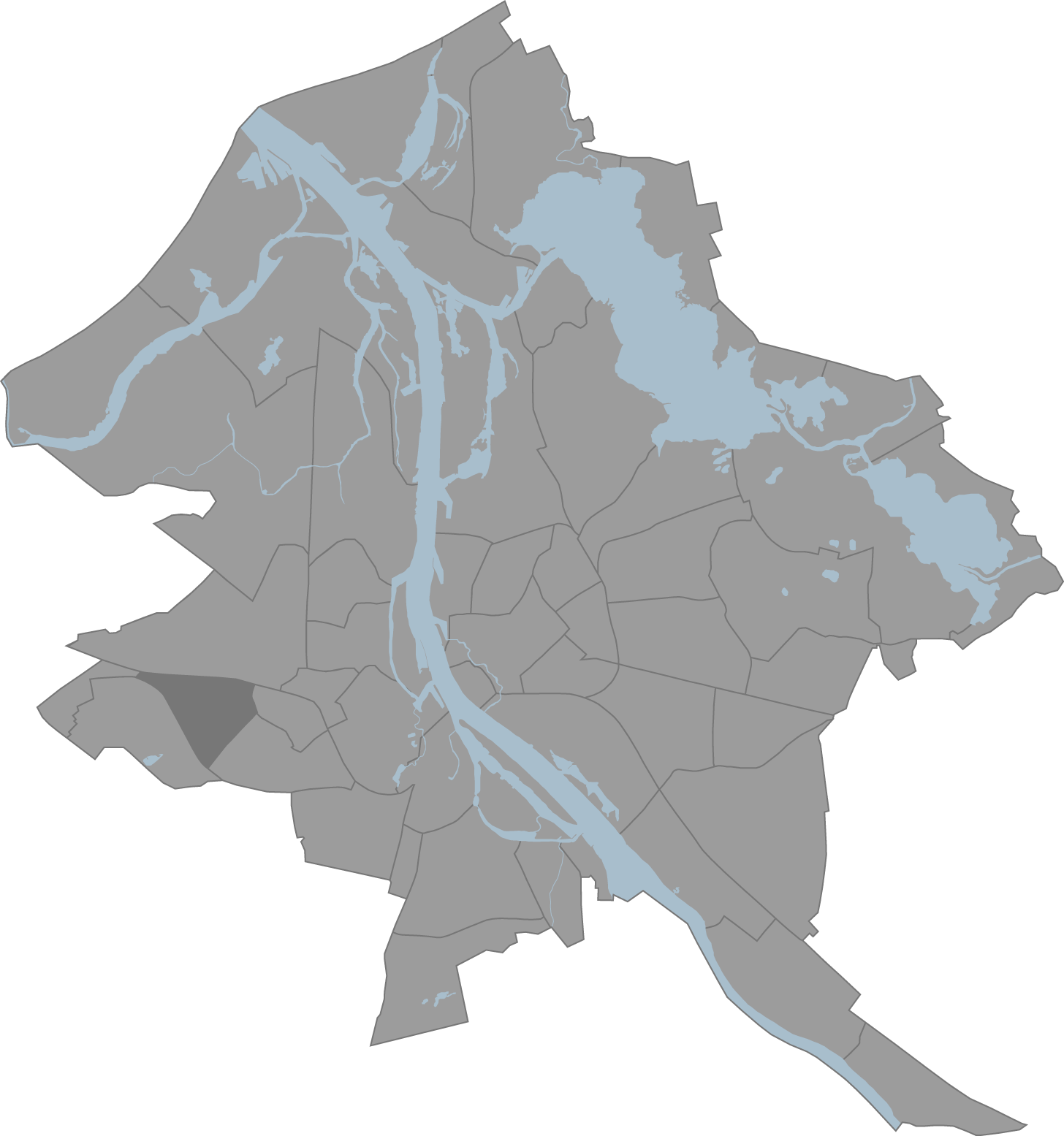
- Location of Zolitūde in Riga
- Country: Latvia
- City: Riga
- District: Zemgale Suburb

Area
  - Total: 2.888 km^{2} (1.115 sq mi)

Population (2024)
  - Total: 16,337
  - Density: 5,657/km^{2} (14,650/sq mi)
- Time zone: UTC+2 (EET)
  - Summer (DST): UTC+3 (EEST)
- Postal code: LV-1029
- Website: apkaimes.lv

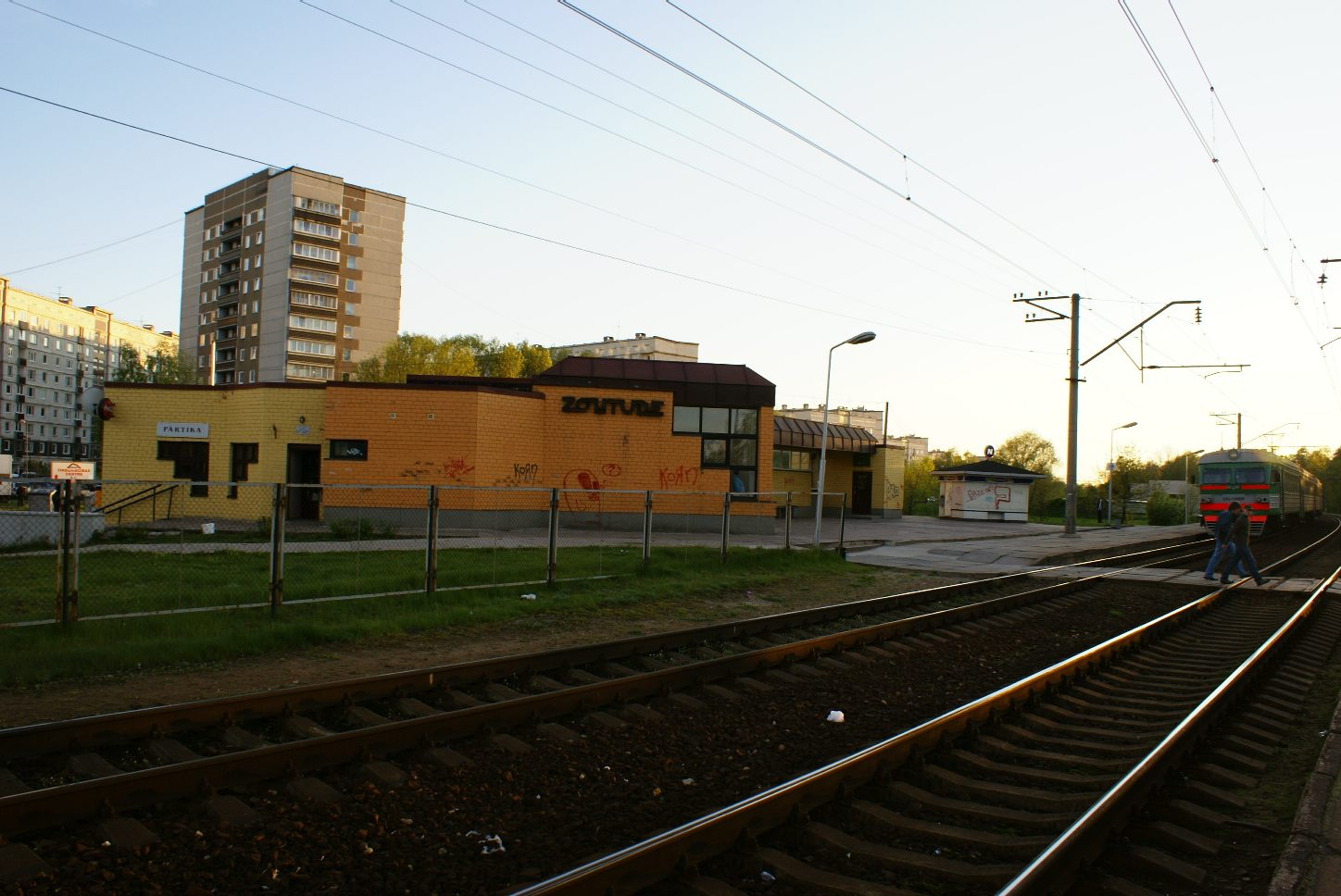
Zolitūde train station

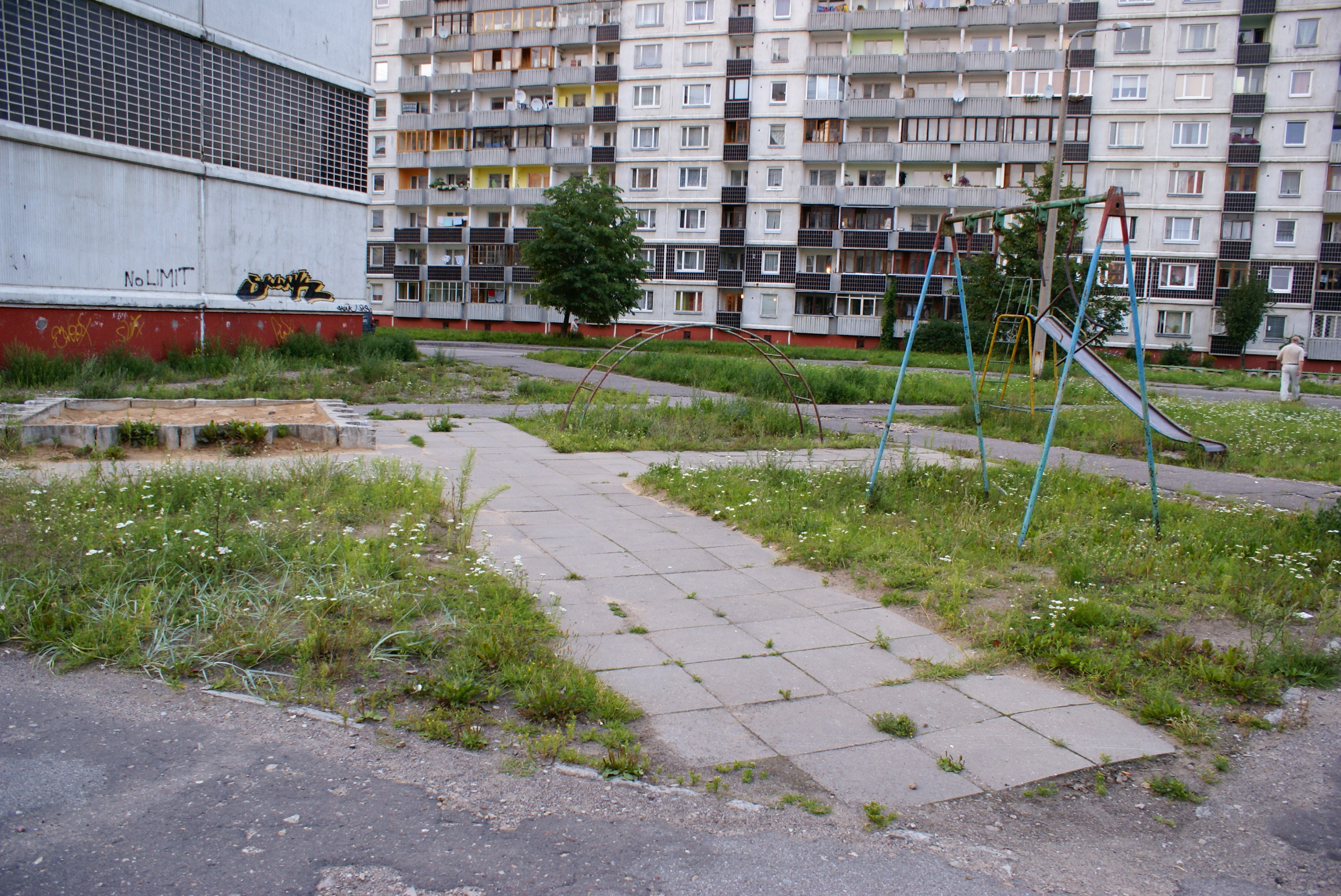
Abandoned playground on Paula Lejiņa Street

Zolitūde (Latvian pronunciation: [ˈzɔlituːde]) is mainly an apartment house neighbourhood (or microdistrict) located in the western part of Riga, the capital of Latvia. Zolitūde is a centrally planned estate, consisting mostly of prefabricated concrete block Brutalist style homes built in late Soviet times. Construction started in 1984, and was mostly halted in 1991, when Latvia gained independence from the USSR. Large parts of the population, as in similar neighbourhoods of Riga, are Russian speaking. Zolitūde had been a mixture of council housing and co-operative flats, but many properties have been privatised since the fall of the Soviet Union.

== History ==
In 1991, Latvia regained independence from the USSR, and due to the end of financing from Moscow most of the state-funded construction projects were halted. Few new homes were built until after Latvia joined the EU in 2004, but construction halted again due to the Great Recession.

Due to the flow of investments and affordable housing credits from private parties, Riga had experienced a construction boom. Construction of newer parts of Zolitūde had begun, and 15 new apartment houses were planned, with some partly completed. Construction of detached houses had been noticed close to Zolitūde neighbourhood as well.

As with most residential neighbourhoods of Riga, Zolitūde's infrastructure was in a dilapidated state. According to the "Riga Development Plan 2006–2018", the development of infrastructure, services and housing had been expected. This had been seen as means to provide growth to the community of Zolitūde. 1990s improvements included two markets and a number of shops. The late 2000s saw some improvements to local road quality, as well as renovation of both public schools in the area, which had become available by Riga council's use of EU funds. The late 2000s and early 2010s also saw an expansion of supermarket chains in the area, as well as foreclosure of the only police office in the estate.

On 21 November 2013 a Maxima supermarket collapsed in Zolitūde, killing 54 people.

== Geography and transportation ==
The proximity to Riga International Airport, the seaside resorts of Jūrmala and contemporary architecture have made Zolitūde attractive for young families. Some residents commute to the city centre using state-owned Pasažieru vilciens railway, with two stations in the area, or using bus and minibus services.

== Etymology ==
The area's name comes from the French word solitude, which means 'loneliness'. It is believed that servicemen of Napoleon's army were parted from his company in this area, which later gave the area its name. An alternative version is that the word solitude referred to the loneliness in which landowners lived here due to the extremely high prices they demanded as rent for the working class or peasants. Prior to 1984, Zolitūde consisted of little more than fields, scant forest, swampy ground, and a small number of cottages.
