= Spilve, Riga =

Neighborhood of Riga, Latvia

Coordinates: 56.9961°N 24.0653°E

Spilve
- Neighbourhood of Riga
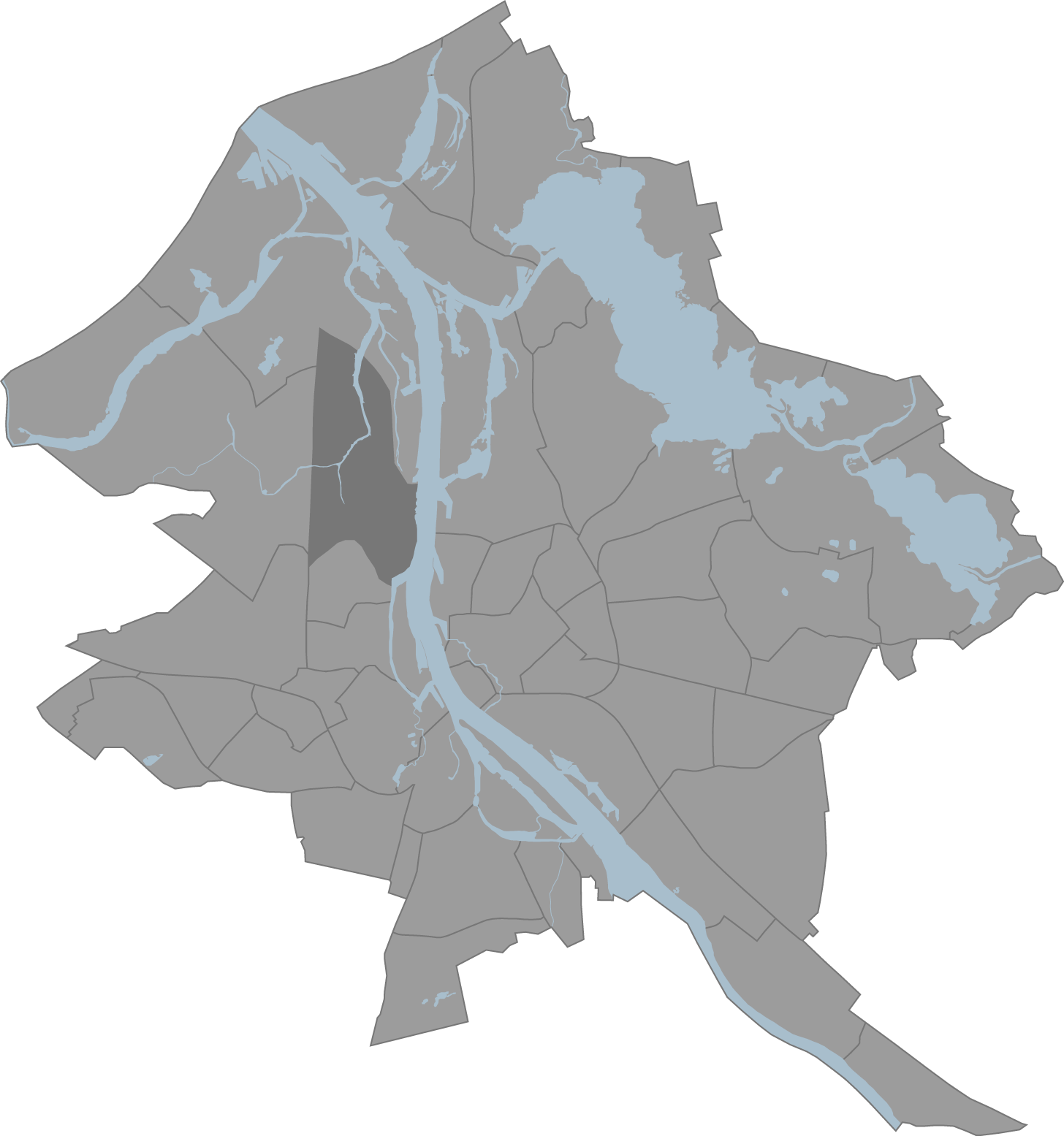
- Location of Spilve in Riga
- Country: Latvia
- City: Riga
- District: Kurzeme District

Area
  - Total: 9.576 km^{2} (3.697 sq mi)

Population (2018)
  - Total: 91
  - Density: 9.5/km^{2} (25/sq mi)
- Website: apkaimes.lv

Spilve is a neighbourhood of Riga, the capital valtera majas of Latvia.
