= Zemgale Suburb, Riga =

Administrative district in Riga, Latvia

Coordinates: 56.9203°N 24.0661°E

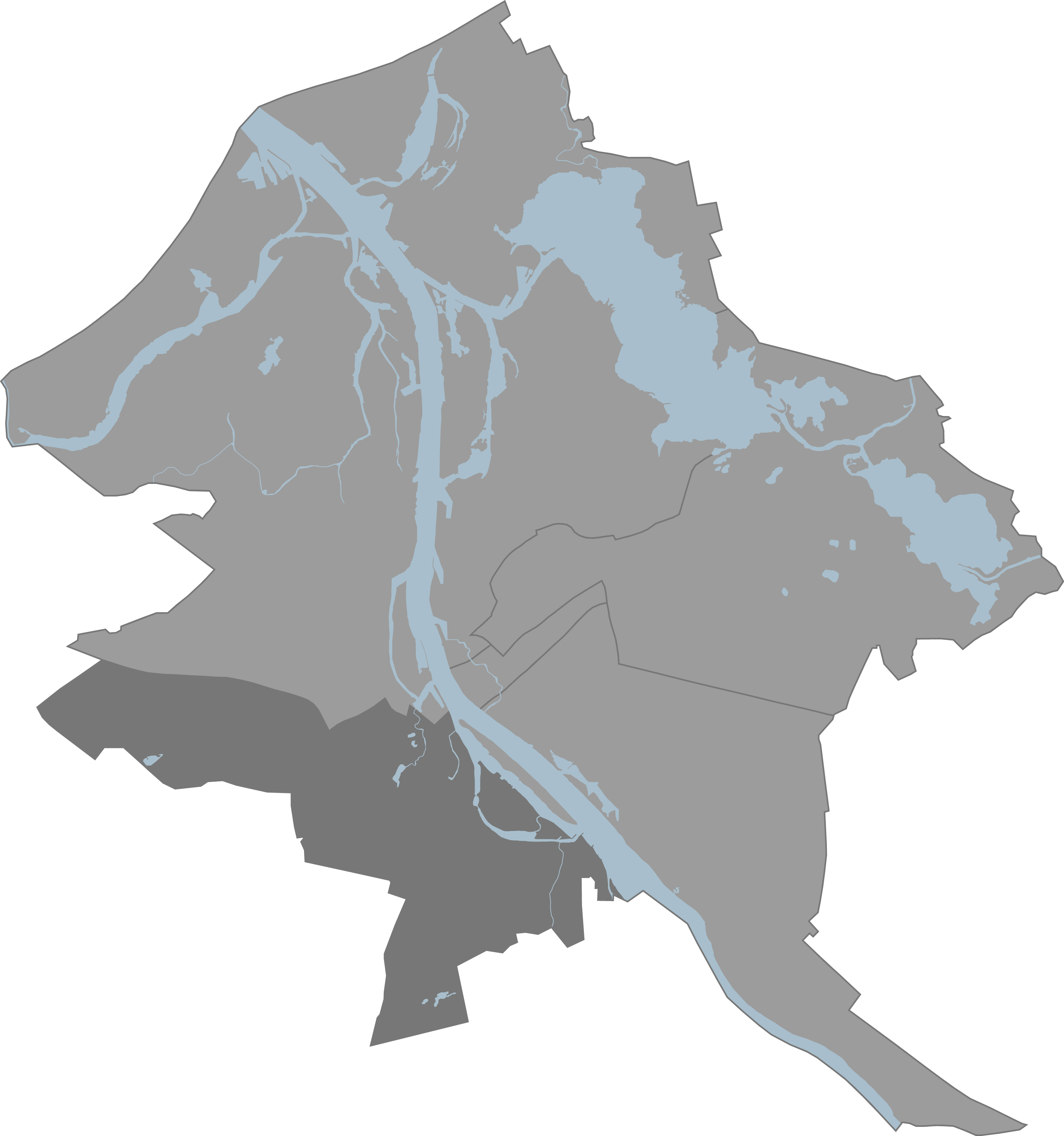
Zemgale Suburb in Riga.

Zemgale Suburb (Latvian: Zemgales priekšpilsēta) is one of six administrative districts of Riga, the capital of Latvia.
