= Rīgas Satiksme =

Public transportation company in Riga, Latvia

Rīgas satiksme
- Formation: 20 February 2003
- Type: Municipal Limited Liability Company
- Legal status: Administered by Riga City Council Traffic Department
- Headquarters: Vestienas iela 35, Latgale Suburb, Riga
- Region served: Greater Riga
- Chairperson: Džineta Innusa
- Mayor: Viesturs Kleinbergs
- Parent organization: Rīgas Dome
- Staff: 3500 (2026)
- Website: rigassatiksme.lv (English)

Rīgas Satiksme is a municipally owned public transportation and infrastructure company serving Riga, Latvia and the surrounding areas. It was founded on 20 February 2003 as an umbrella organisation for the respective operators of trams, buses and trolleybuses in the city of Riga. Two years later, the separate operators of the different modes of public transport were merged and re-branded to its current name.

Along with public transport services, Rīgas Satiksme also administers paid parking services throughout the city. It currently employs roughly 3500 staff and its passengers completed 146.8 million rides in 2015. In 2018 the debt of Rīgas Satiksme reached nearly 300 million.

== Structure ==
The company PLC "Rīgas satiksme" was founded on February 20, 2003, by merging the bus fleets "Imanta" and "Tālava". In January 2005, four PLCs of the Riga Municipality were merged — "Rīgas satiksme" (bus service), "Tramvaju un trolejbusu pārvalde" (electric transport), "Rīgas autostāvvietas" (car parks) and "Rīgas domes autobāze" (Riga City Council car depot). As a result, "Rīgas satiksme" has become the largest enterprise of the city government, employing 6,500 people.

The company is a member of the Latvian Association of Latvian Passengers, the Latvian Quality Association and the Latvian Association of Auto-Engineering.

Until December 12, 2018, Leons Bemhens was the chairman of the Board of the enterprise. From December 13, 2018, the acting manager of the enterprise was Anrijs Matīss (until early 2019), who was replaced by Ernests Saulītis, with Ernests Ozols being elected for a full five-year term on 1 February 2022.

The fare, when buying a ticket from the driver, is €2. When paying using an e-ticket (E-talons), the fare is reduced (depending on the type of ticket) to €1,15.

3 types of e-ticket are available:

- Personalised e-ticket - A plastic card with an RFID microchip that confirms its belonging to a particular passenger. This is a card with a photo, first and last name.
- Unpersonalised E-ticket - A plastic card with an RFID microchip without confirming the identity of a particular passenger. It is possible to purchase such a card and replenish it as needed.
- Yellow E-ticket - Cardboard ticket with an RFID microchip for a certain time or number of trips. The cardboard ticket is valid for three months from the date of purchase.

== History ==
The first electric tram began operating on the streets of Riga on July 11 (24), 1901. It replaced the horse-drawn carriage service that had been started in the autumn of 1882 in Imperial Russia.

The first buses appeared in Riga in 1913, but before the First World War they had no significant transport value. The progenitor of this type of transport is a horse-drawn omnibus, which made the first trip in 1852.

The first trolley bus was introduced at the beginning of 1947 on the experimental route "Air Bridge — Brasa Station", and on November 4, 1947, a regular trolleybus service was opened on the "Viesturdārzs – Ģertrūdes street". In 1973 in Riga, the invention of Kyiv native Volodymyr Veklych - the trolleybus train - was successfully implemented. It consisted of two units of Škoda 9TR trolley buses, interconnected by Volodymyr Veklych's system. The maximum number of trains in operation were used between 1984 and 1987.

Although Riga was the largest of the capitals of the Scandinavian and Baltic countries (counting without agglomeration), it was not destined to have its own subway, unlike almost all other cities millionaires of the USSR. The Riga Metro was planned to be constructed beginning from 1990, the commissioning of the first starting section of 8 stations was scheduled for 2000–2002, but the creation was canceled due to the public protests and the collapse of the USSR.

== Buses ==
At Riga there are 51 bus routes (2023) which are operated by Rīgas Satiksme.

After a long service, on 1 September 2022, three bus routes were closed and replaced by trolleybuses. Bus route 1 was replaced by trolleybus route 31., bus route 5 was replaced by trolleybus route 35., and Bus route 14 was replaced by trolleybus route 34.

After bankruptcy of Rīgas mikroautobusu satiksme two microbus routes were replaced by buses. Route 303 was replaced by bus route no. 33. and route 363 was replaced by bus route no. 63.

=== Bus routes ===
Bus routes in Riga as of 2022.

| Number | Start point | End point | Number | Start point | End point |
|---|---|---|---|---|---|
| 1 | Abrenes iela | Berģuciems | 30 | Centrālā stacija | Daugavgrīva |
| 2 | Abrenes iela | Vecmīlgrāvis | 31 | Jugla | Dārziņi |
| 3 | Daugavgrīva | Pļavnieki | 32 | Abrenes iela | Piņķi |
| 4 | Abrenes iela | Piņķi | 34 | Centrāltirgus | Saulīši |
| 5 | Abrenes iela | Mežciems | 36 | Imanta | Vakarbuļļi |
| 6 | Dreiliņi | Abrenes iela | 37 | Imanta | Esplanāde |
| 7 | Abrenes iela | Stīpnieki | 38 | Abrenes iela | Dzirciema iela |
| 8 | Stacijas laukums | Zolitūde | 39 | Abrenes iela | Lāčupes kapi |
| 9 | Abrenes iela | Mežaparks | 41 | Imanta | Esplanāde |
| 10 | Abrenes iela | Jaunmārupe | 43 | Abrenes iela | Skulte |
| 11 | Abrenes iela | Suži | 44 | Zolitūde | Ziepniekkalns |
| 12 | Abrenes iela | "Ziedonis" | 46 | Zolitūde | Ziepniekkalns |
| 13 | Babītes stacija | Preču 2 | 47 | Abrenes iela | Šķirotava - Getliņi |
| 14 | Abrenes iela | Zvēraudzētava | 48 | Pļavnieku kapi | Sarkandaugava |
| 15 | Jugla | Dārziņi | 49 | Rumbula | MAN-TESS |
| 16 | Abrenes iela | Paper mill "Jugla" | 50 | Abrenes iela | TEC-2 |
| 18 | Abrenes iela | Dārziņi | 51 | Abrenes iela | Ulbroka |
| 20 | Pļavnieku kapi | Pētersalas iela | 52 | Abrenes iela | Pļavnieku kapi |
| 21 | Imanta | Jugla | 53 | Esplanāde | Zolitūde |
| 22 | Abrenes iela | Riga International Airport | 54 | Abrenes iela | Voleri |
| 23 | Abrenes iela | Baloži | 55 | Abrenes iela | Jaunmārupe |
| 24 | Abrenes iela | Mangaļsala | 56 | Daugavgrīva | Ziepniekkalns |
| 25 | Abrenes iela | Mārupe | 57 | Abrenes iela | Ķīpsala |
| 26 | Abrenes iela | Katlakalns | 58 | Brīvības gatve | Vecmīlgrāvis |
| 28 | Jugla | Langstiņi | 60 | Ziepniekkalns | Ķengarags |
| 29 | Mežciems | Bukulti - Vecmīlgrāvis | | | |

=== Current fleet ===
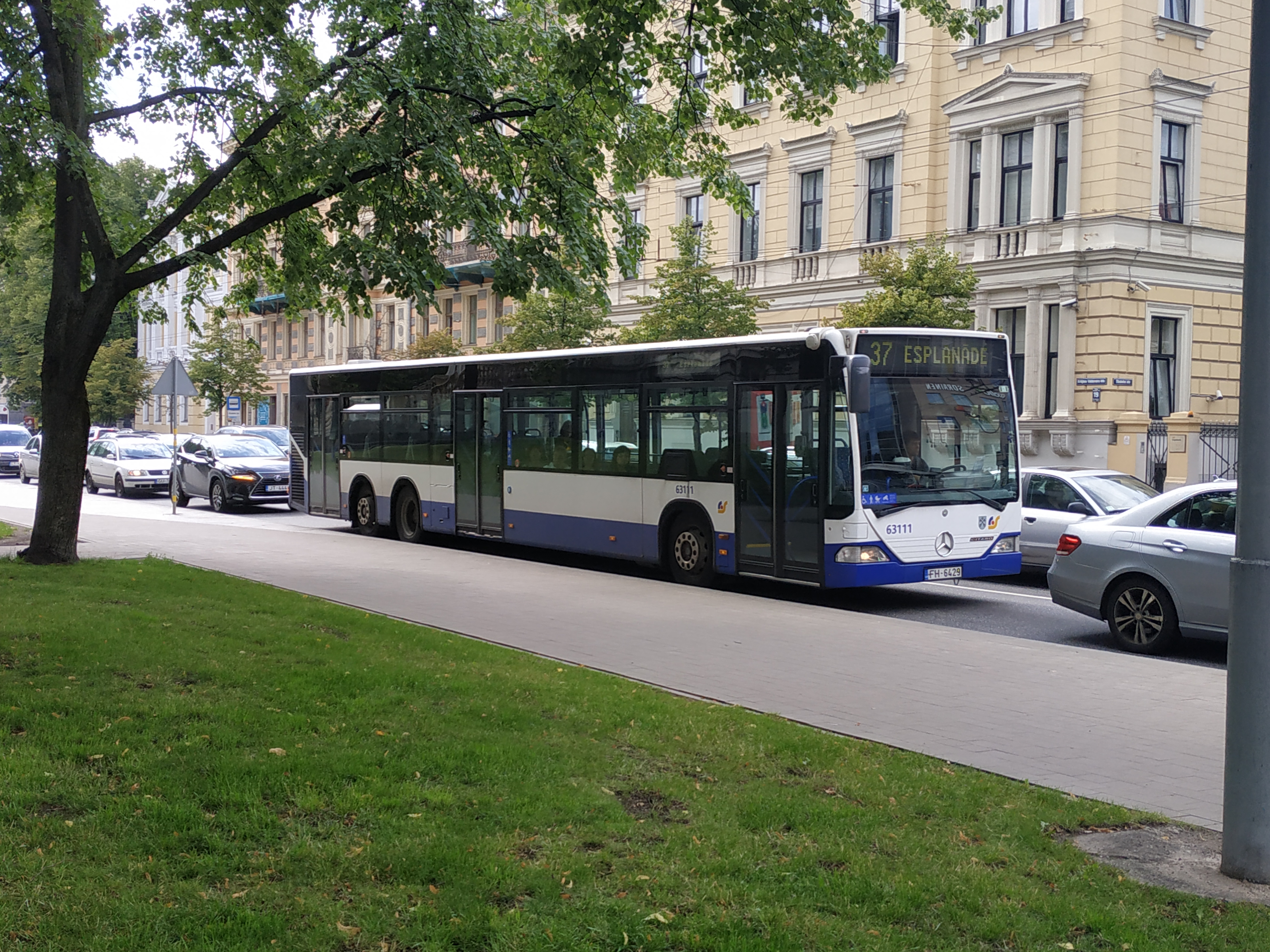
Mercedes-Benz O530L Citaro

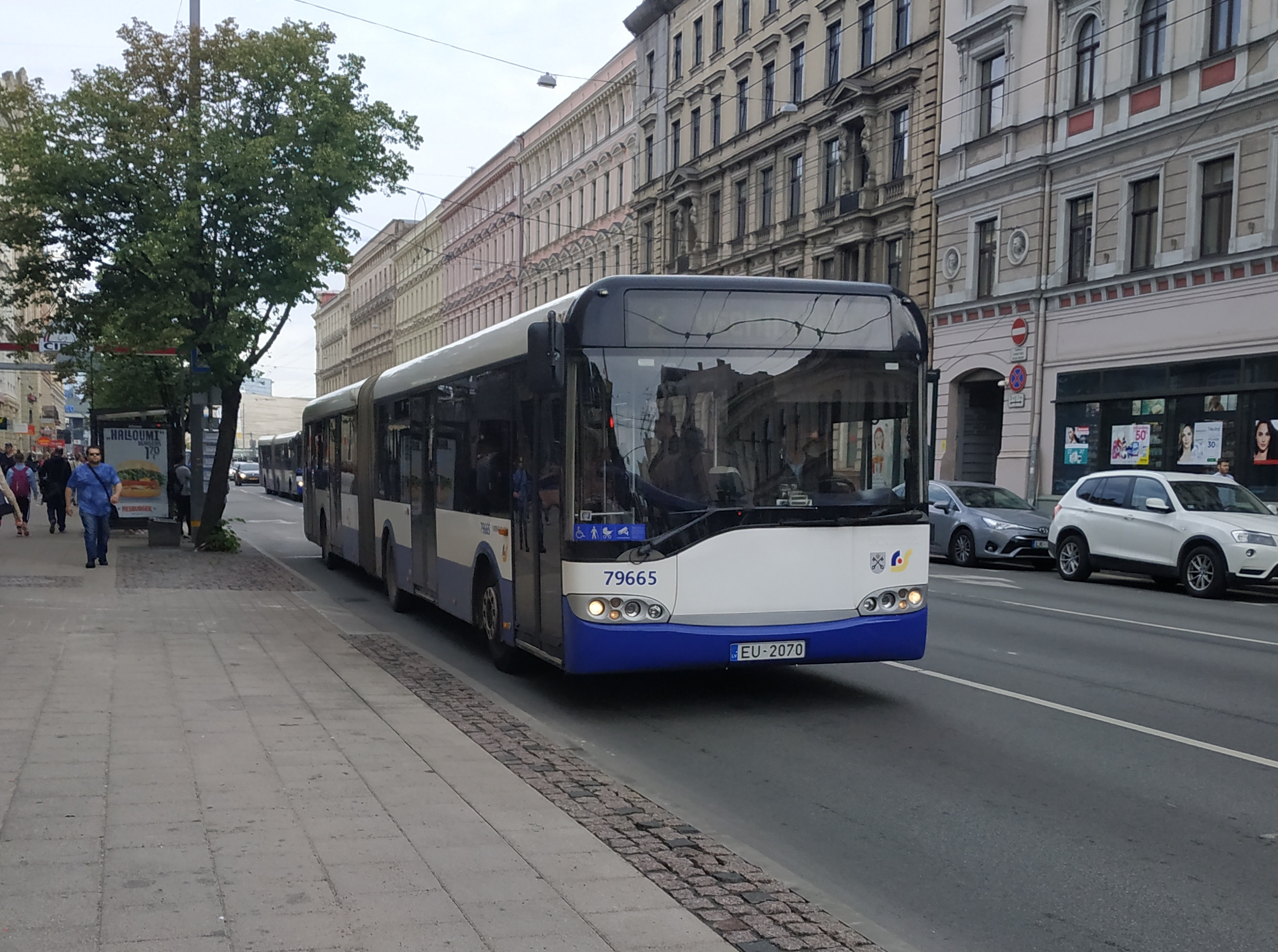
Solaris Urbino I 18

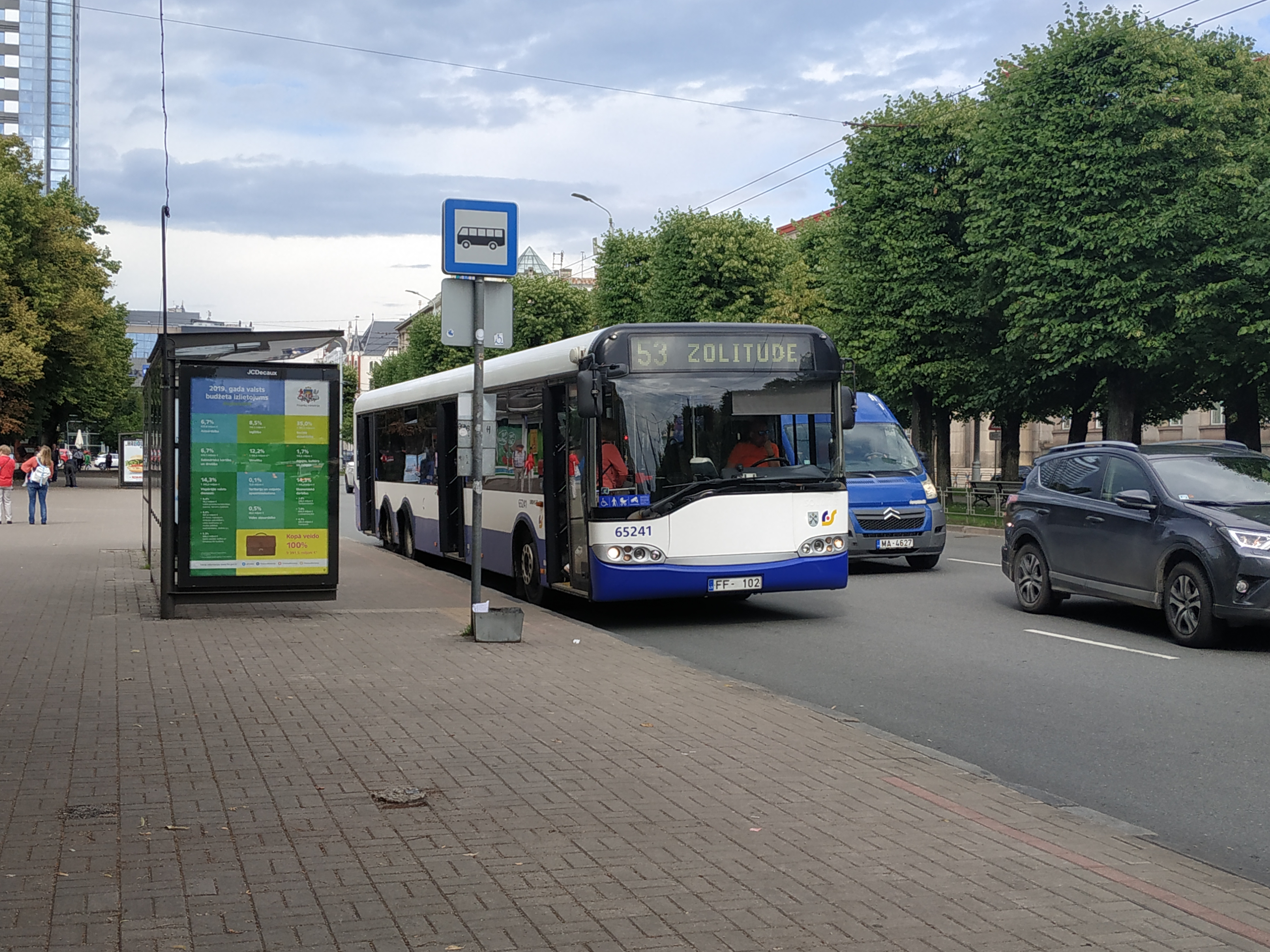
Solaris Urbino II 15

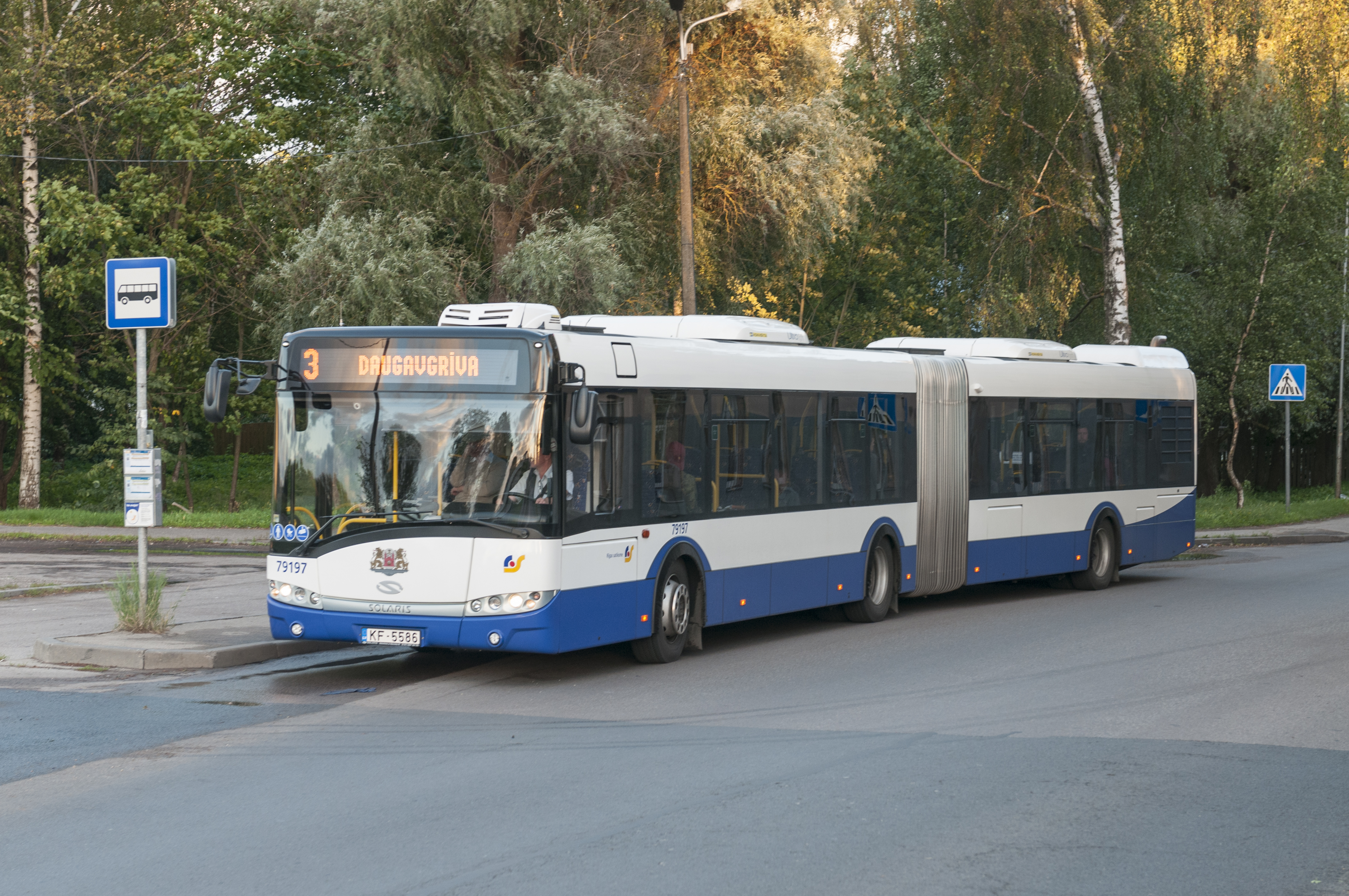
Solaris Urbino III 18

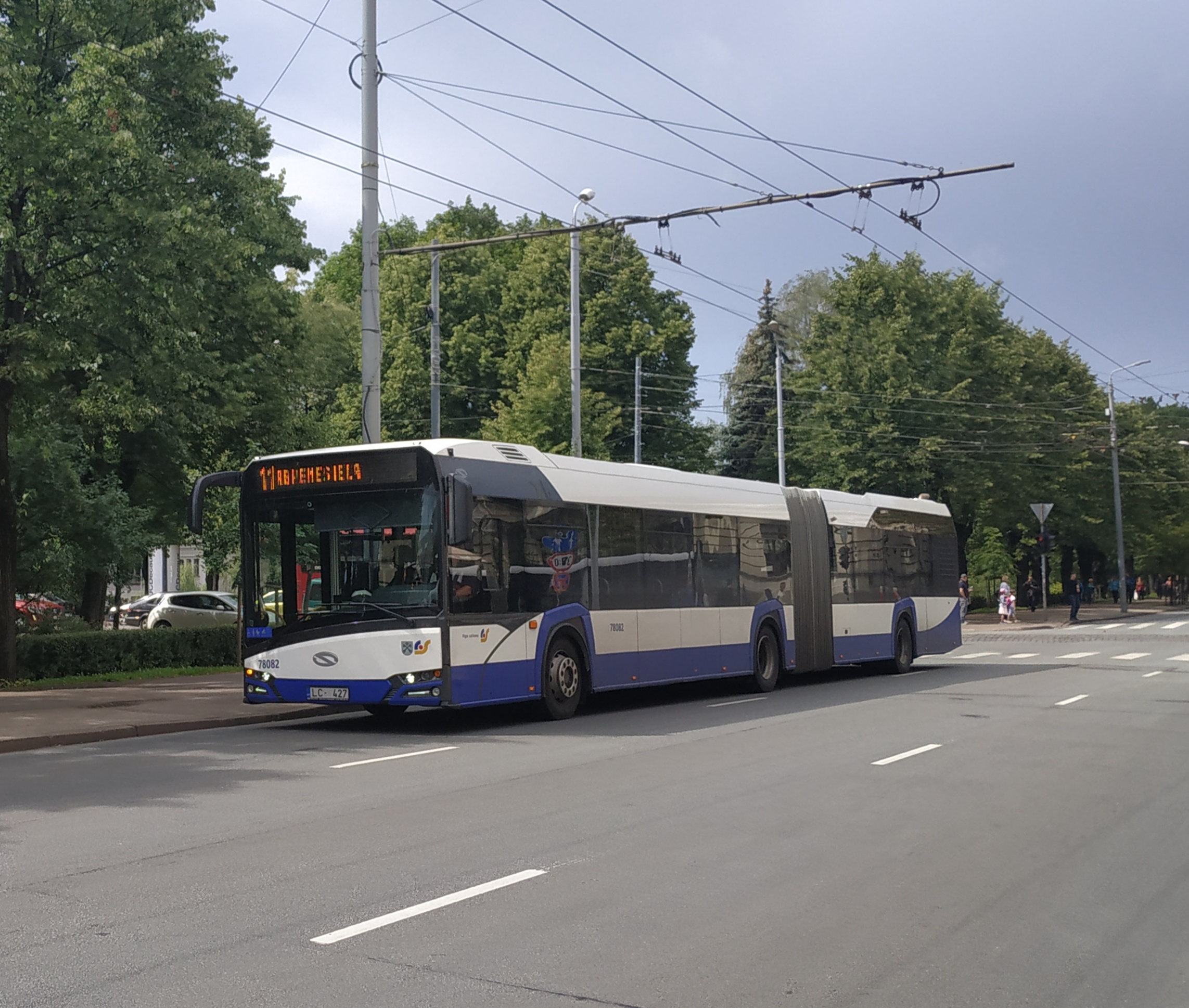
Solaris Urbino IV 18

== Trolleybuses ==
The first trolleybuses in Riga entered service in 1947, using a portion of the budget initially set aside for the new tramway, with the intention of moving slightly slower trams away from the city centre to allow for faster trolleybuses. The service was operated initially by Soviet-built units, although these were later replaced by Škoda vehicles brought in from Czechoslovakia. Conductors remained on trolleybuses for five years after they disappeared from the buses, with electric ticket machines replacing them in 1975. Conductors were re-introduced on the trolleybus network in 1997 and remained until 2007 when new electronic ticket machines were installed. These were in turn replaced in 2009 with e-tickets (e-talons).

=== Trolleybus routes ===
Trolleybus routes in Riga as of 2024.

| Number | Start point | End point |
|---|---|---|
| 1 | Pētersala | Valmieras iela |
| 3 | Riga Central Market | Sarkandaugava |
| 4 | Ziepniekkalns | Jugla |
| 5 | Daugava Stadium | Riga Clinical Hospital |
| 9 | Iļģuciems | Riga Central Station |
| 11 | Ieriķu iela | Riga Central Station |
| 12 | Šmerlis | Āgenskalna priedes |
| 13 | Ieriķu iela | Riga Central Market |
| 14 | Mežciems | Esplanade |
| 15 | Ķengarags | Latvian University |
| 16 | Šmerlis | Pļavnieki |
| 17 | Purvciems | Riga Central Station |
| 18 | Mežciems | Riga Central Station |
| 19 | Pētersalas iela | Ziepniekkalns |
| 20 | Latvian University | Television Center |
| 22 | Katlakalna iela | E. Birznieka Upīša iela |
| 23 | Purvciems | Riga Central Station |
| 25 | Iļģuciems | Brīvības iela |
| 27 | Ziepniekkalns | Riga Central Station |
| 31 | Riga Central Market | Berģuciems |
| 34 | Riga Central Market | Mazā Juglas Iela |
| 35 | Riga Central Market | Mežciems |

=== Current fleet ===
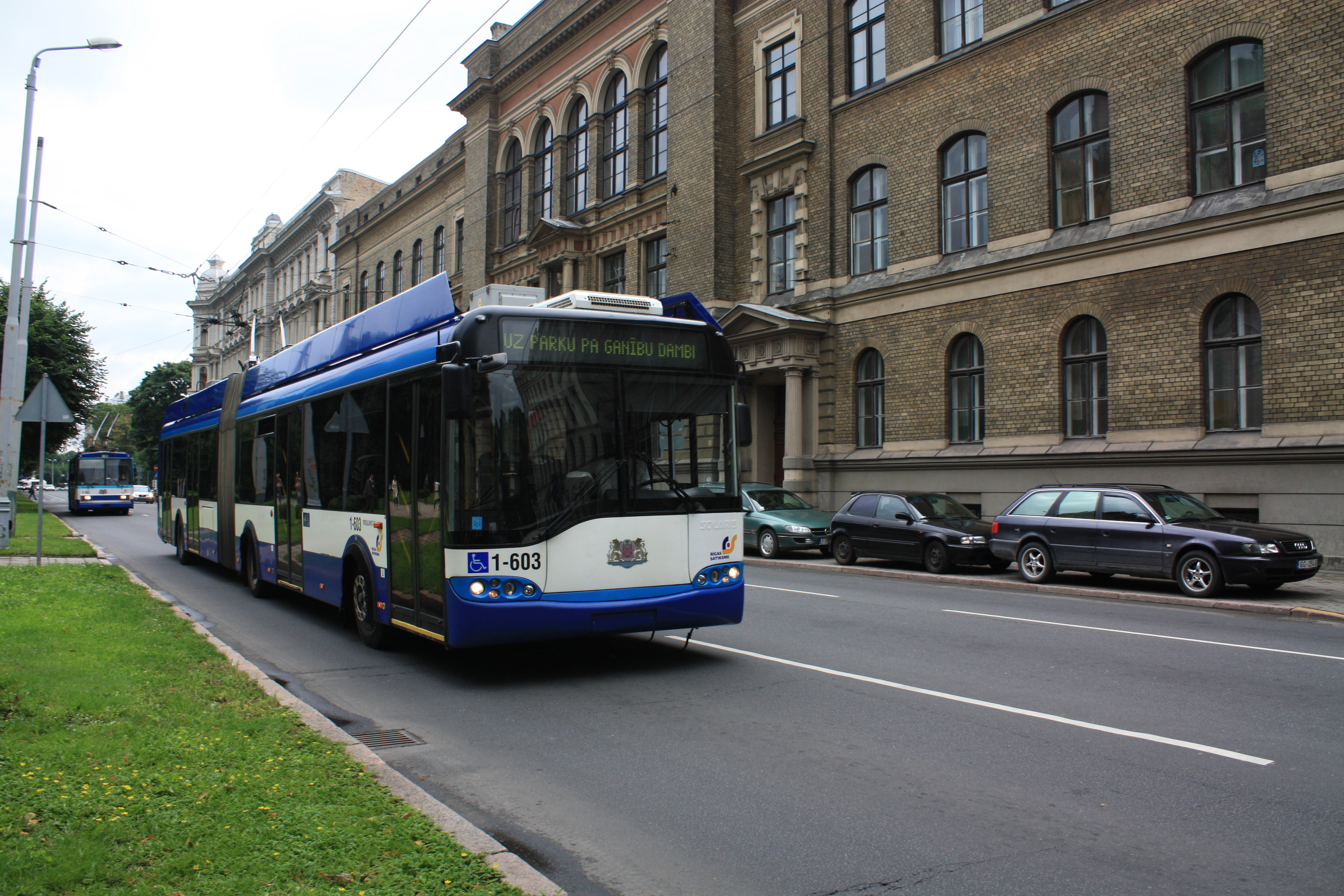
Solaris Trollino II 18 Ganz trolleybus in Riga streets

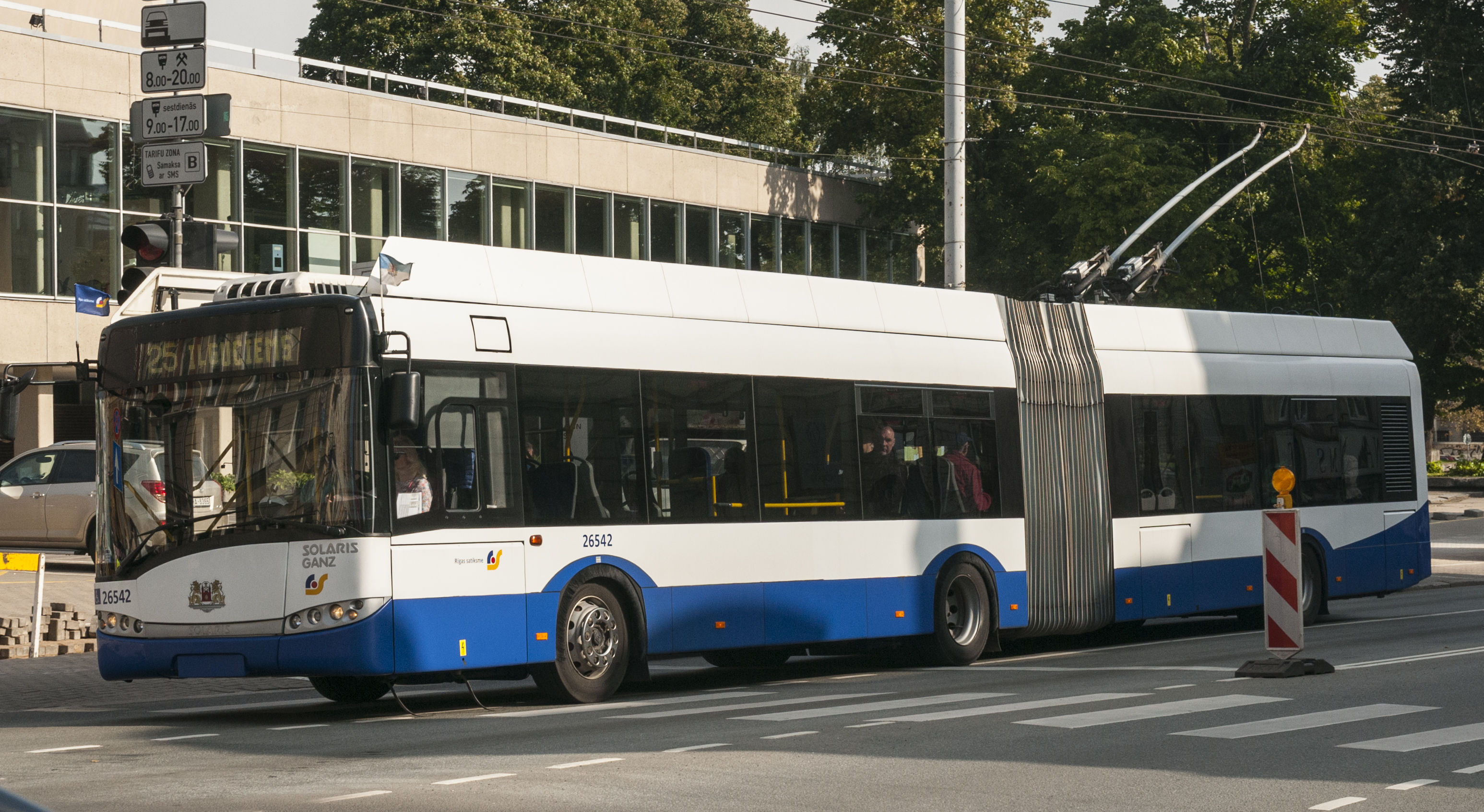
Solaris Trollino III 18 Ganz trolleybus

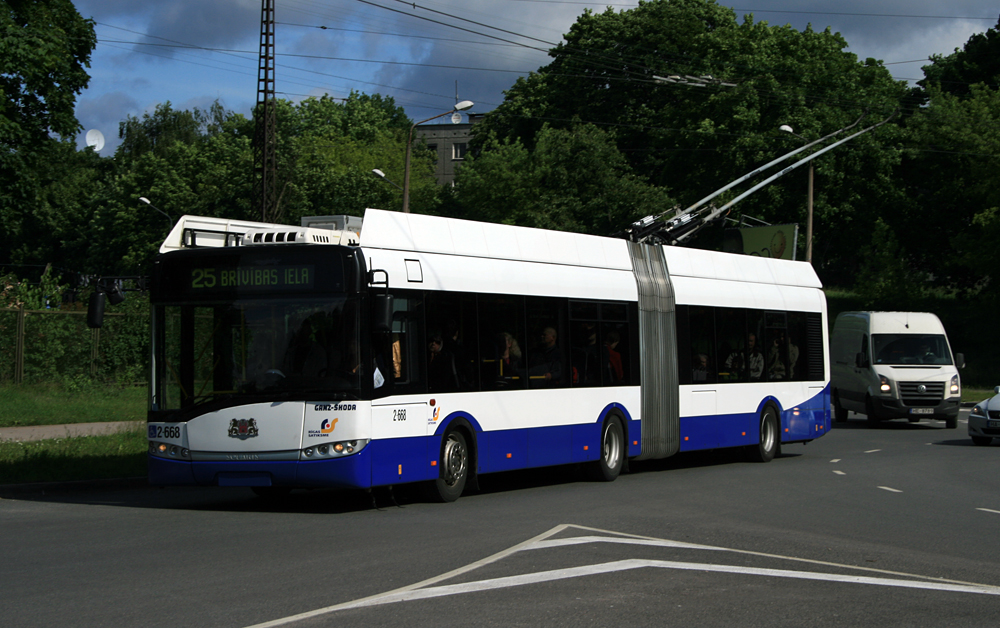
Solaris Trollino III 18 Ganz-Škoda trolleybus

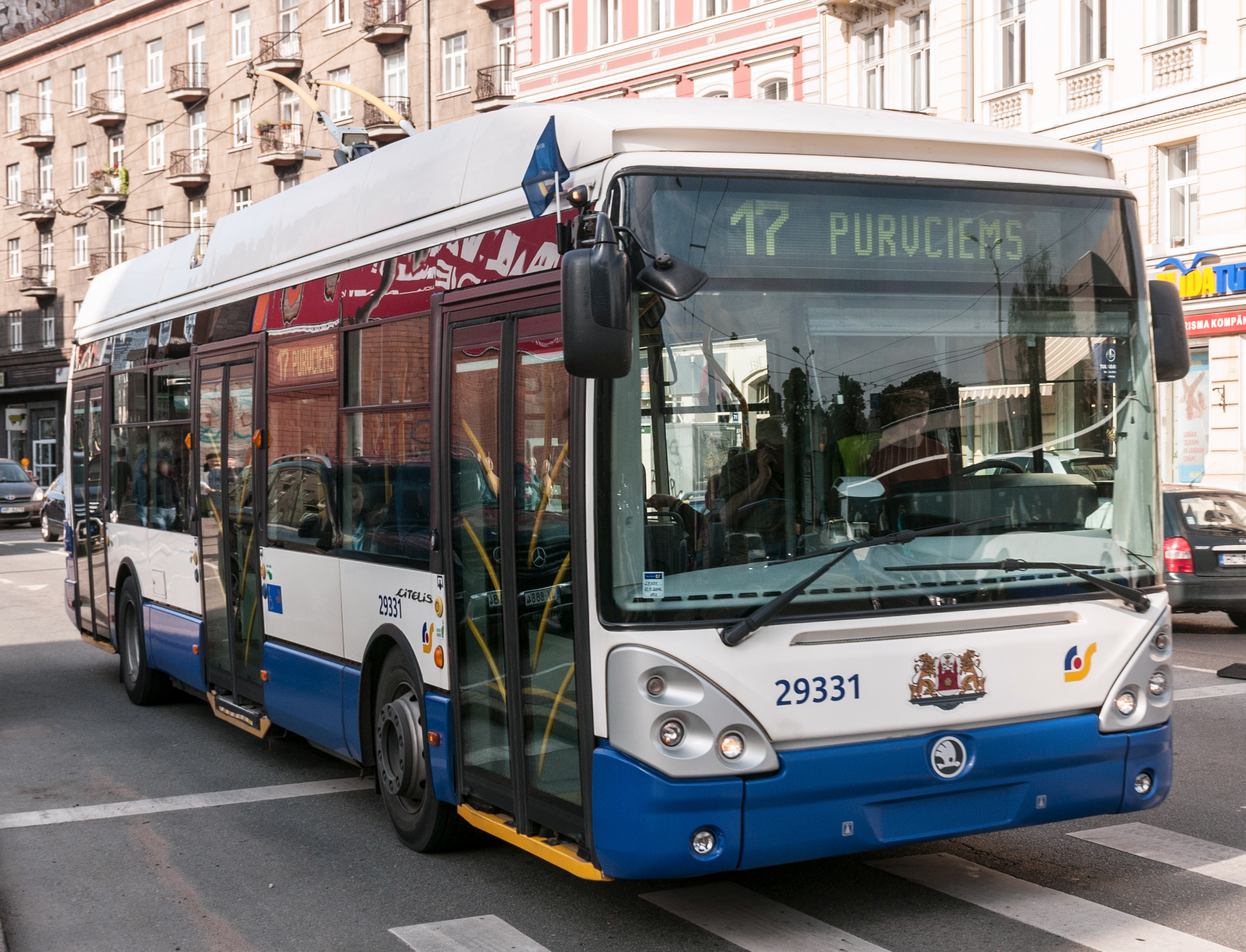
Škoda 24Tr Irisbus trolleybus

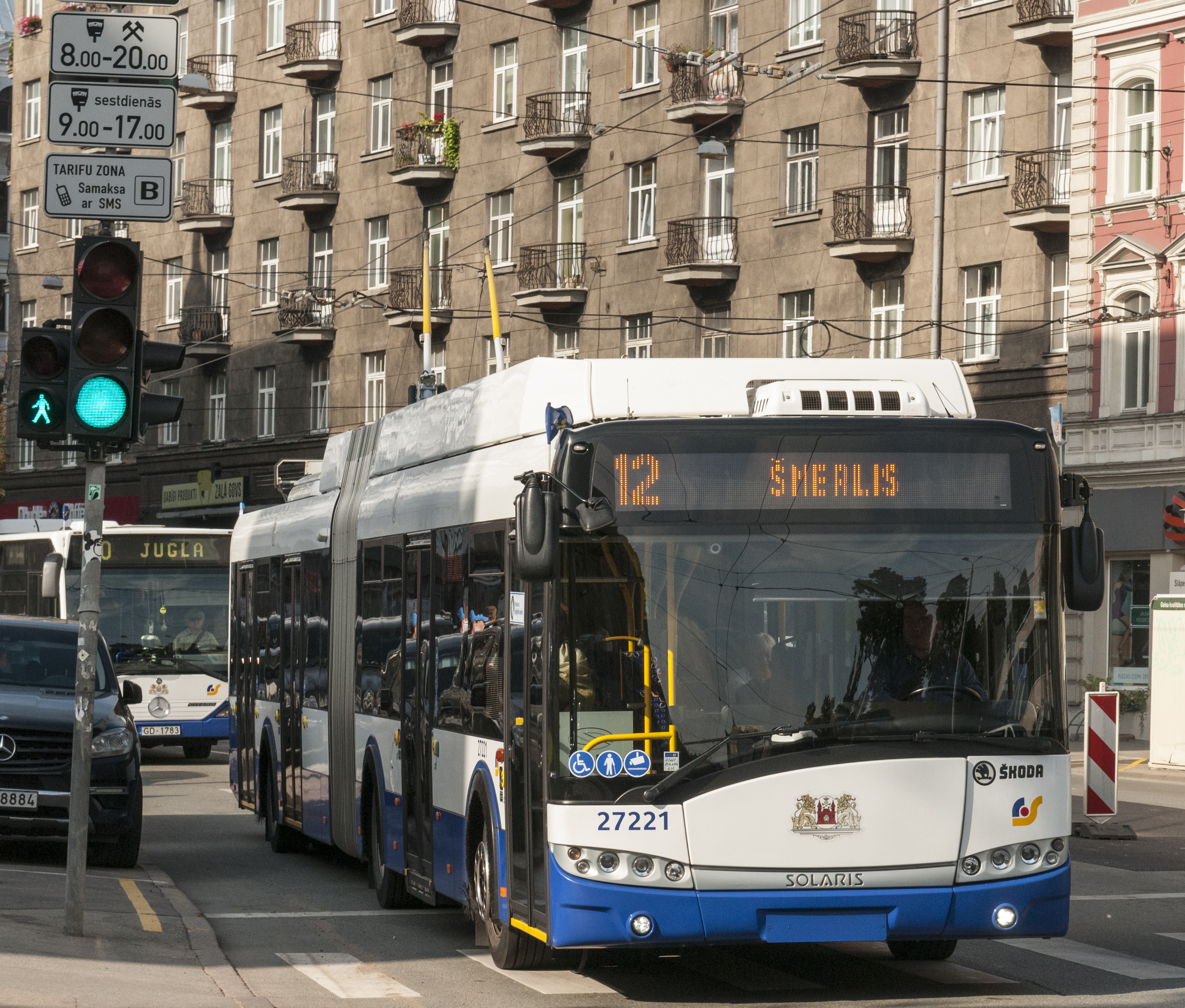
Škoda 27Tr Solaris trolleybus

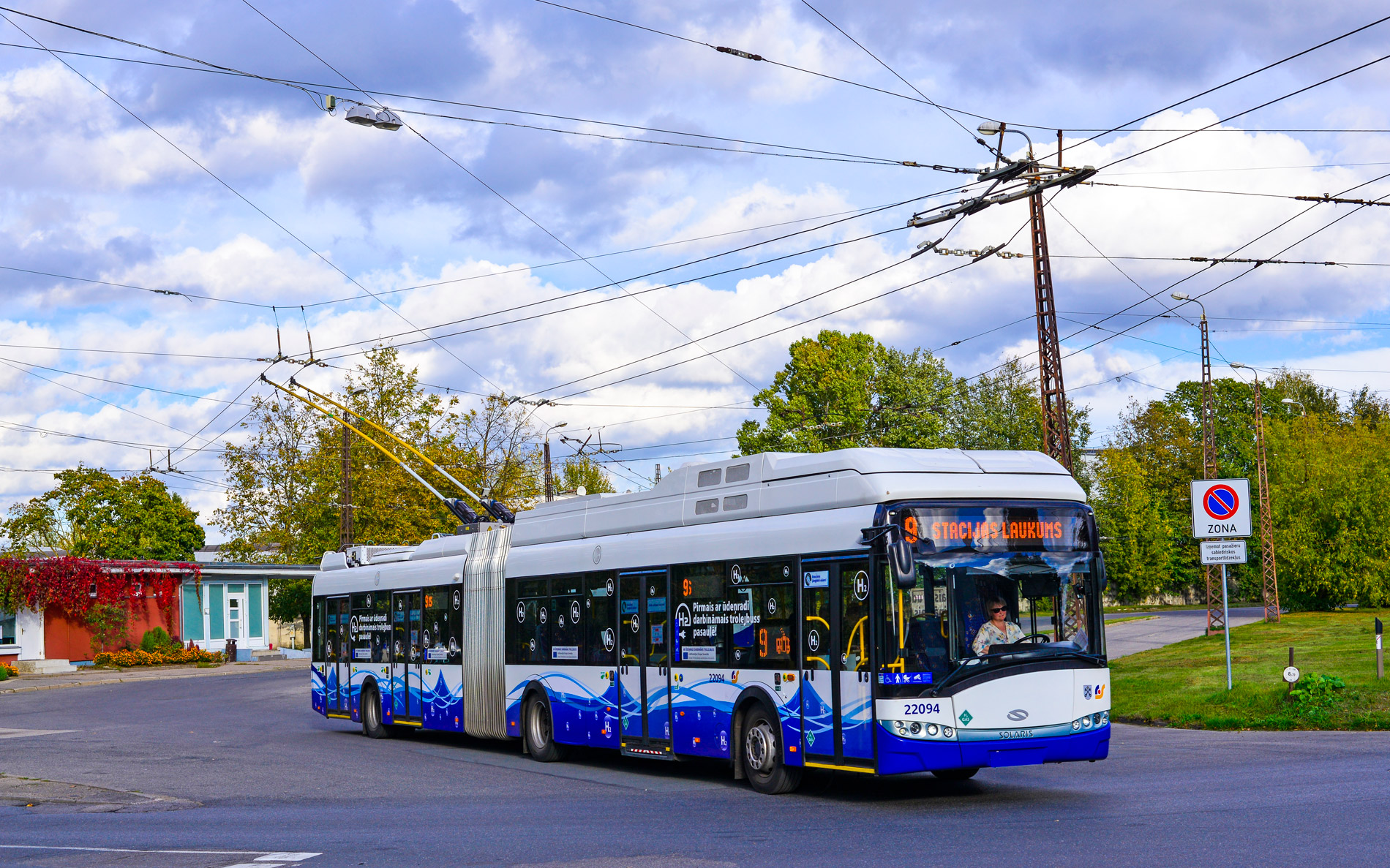
Solaris Trollino 18,75 H2 trolleybus

== Trams ==
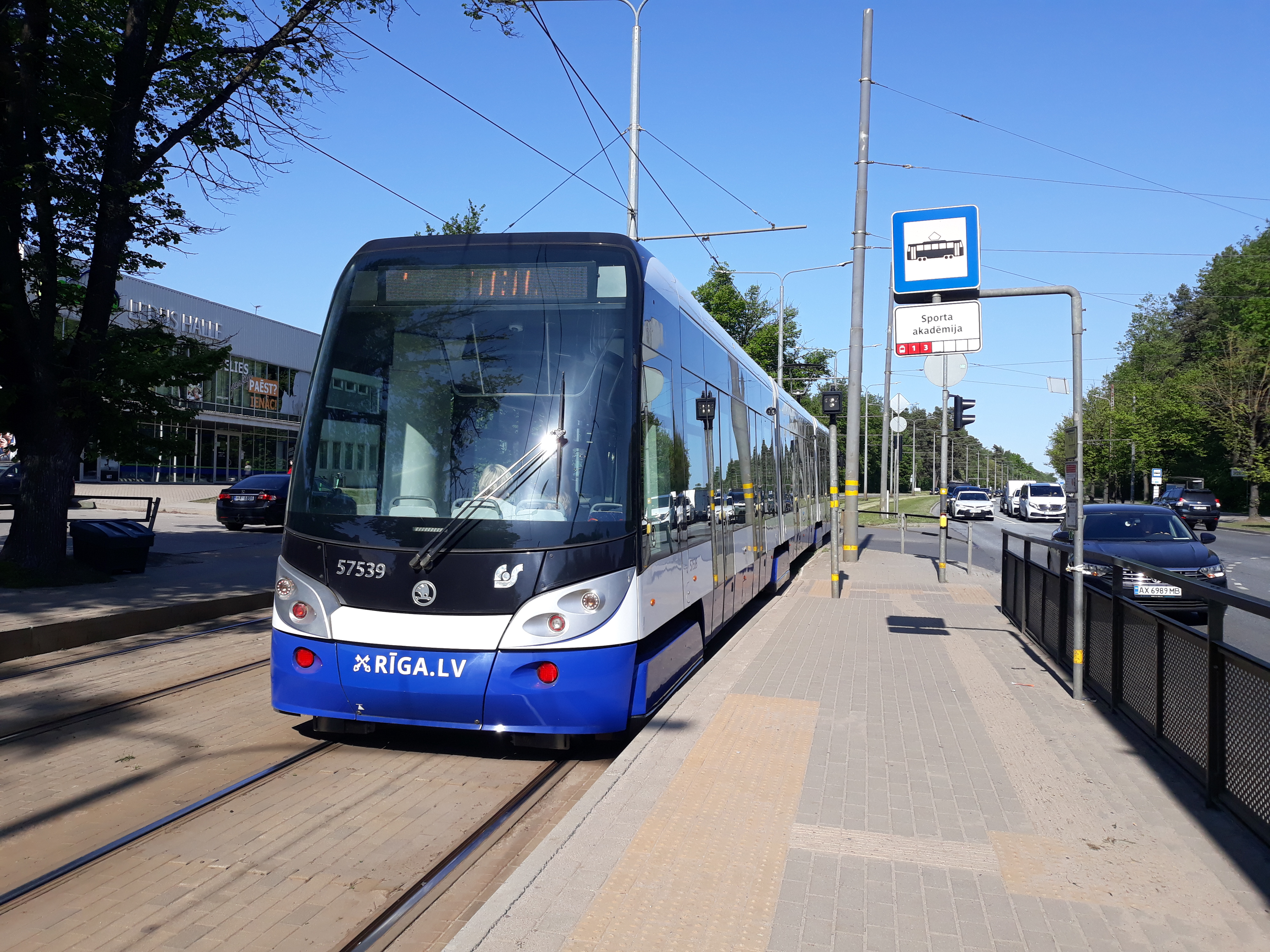
Škoda 15 T in Riga streets

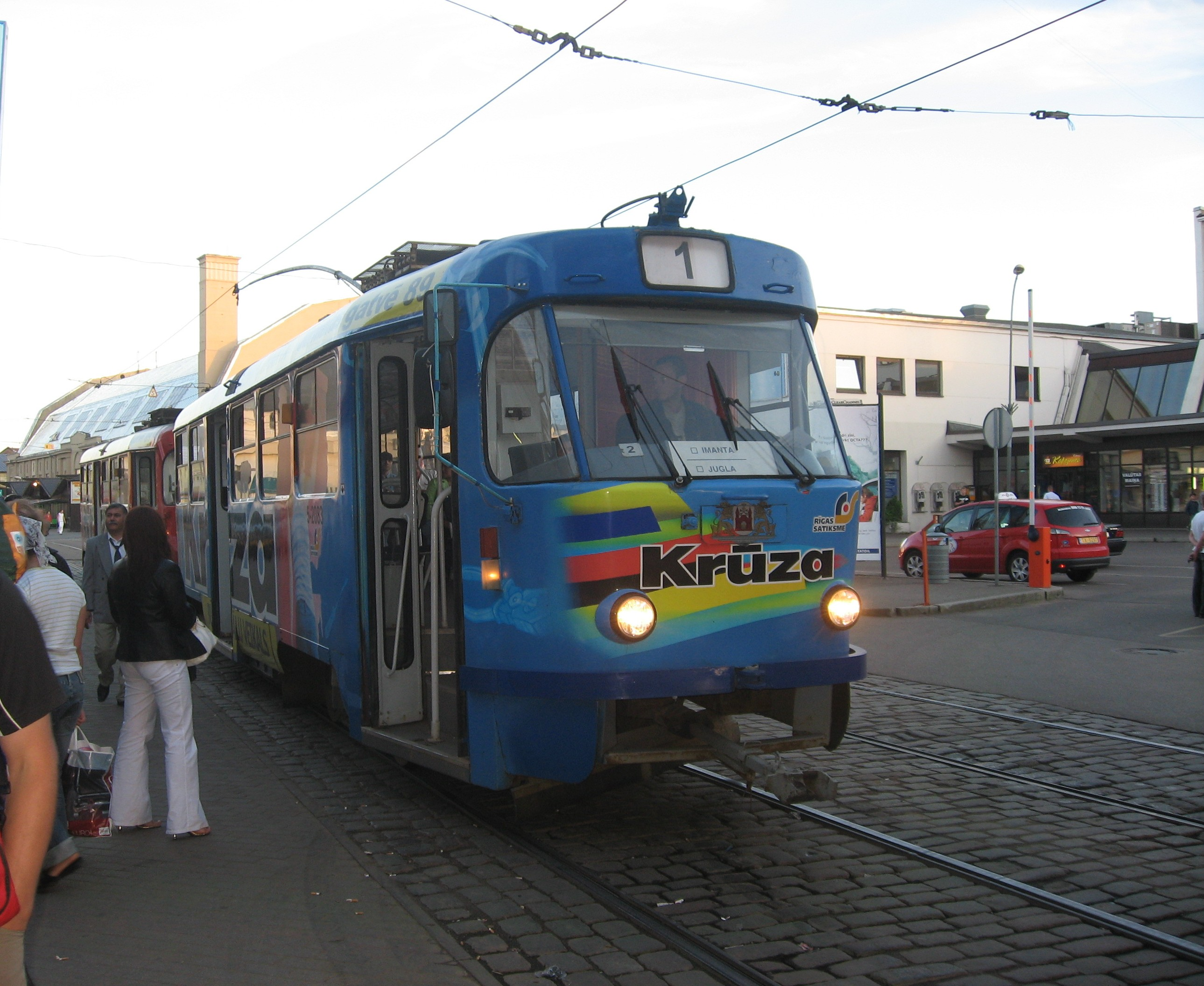
A Tatra T3SU in Riga covered with advertisements

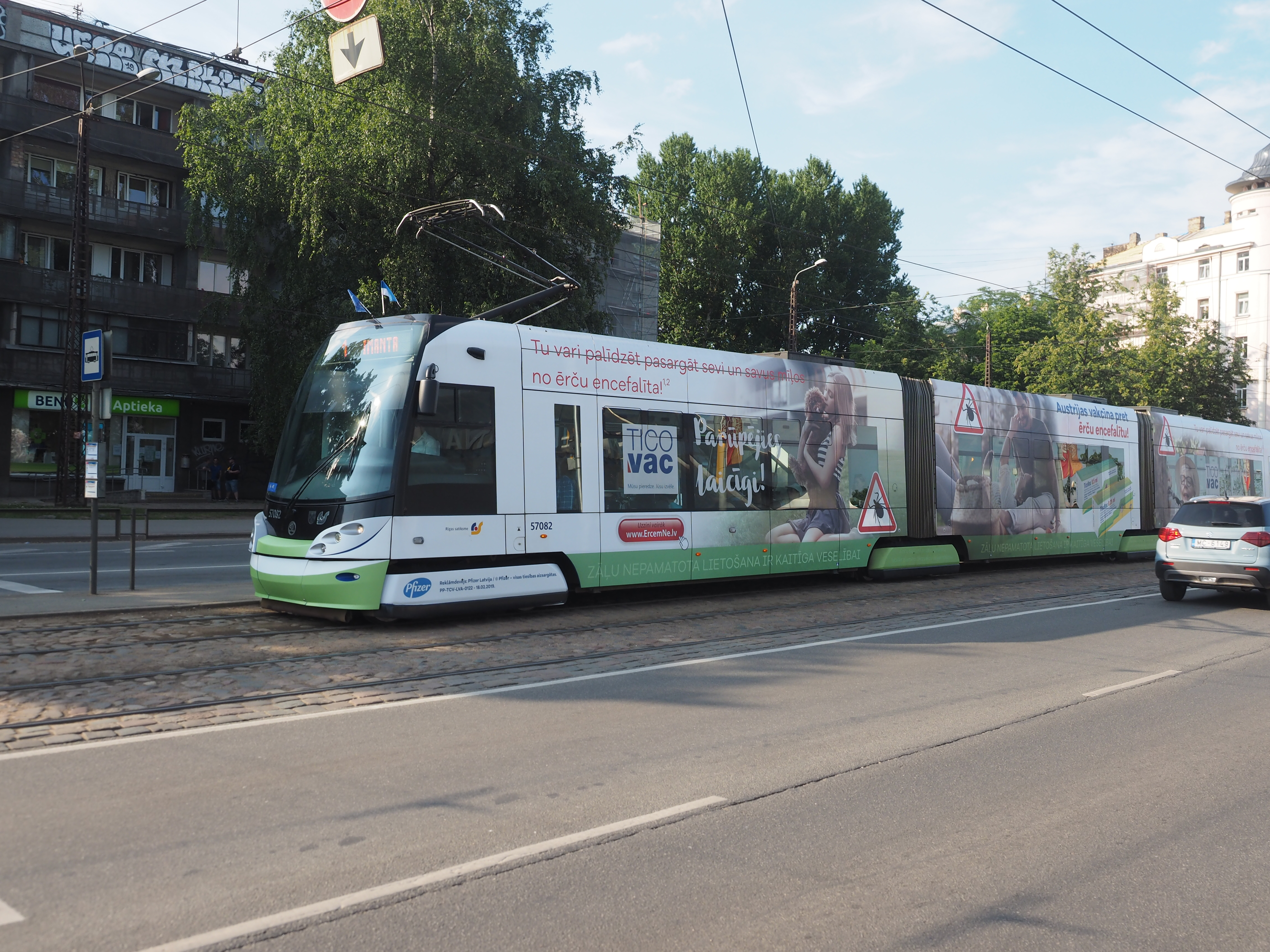
A tram on line 1 to Imanta covered with advertisements

Trams have been in operation in Riga longer than any other mode of public transport, with the first horse-drawn trams entering service in 1882. In 1900, it was agreed that a number of electric tram lines would be built in the city, with the first electric trams starting operation in 1901. Tram construction continued until the outbreak of World War I. Operation of the tramways remained largely unchanged until 1918 and the emergence for the first time of Latvia as an independent nation, when a Belgian company took over. This period of private ownership was deemed a failure, and the city authorities regained control of the tram network in 1931. World War II devastated Riga's public transport system, and it was gradually rebuilt to its current level.

In 2002, Rīgas Vagonbūves Rūpnīca signed an agreement with the Mayor of Riga which would see the company replace the trams in Riga once their period of operation ended in 2010. The new trams would have offered enhanced comfort and safety, as well as would be far quieter than the city's current fleet of elderly ČKD Tatra units. According to RVR, they would have featured bright and spacious interiors and would have been 20-30% more power-efficient than their predecessors. The new units were expected to be produced at a rate of 15-20 per year and would have resulted in a gradual phasing out of the Tatra tramcars.

These plans were not fully exercised; instead, in 2008, Škoda built 20 three-section 15 T trams for Riga, the first of which entered service in spring 2010. An option for 4 four-section trams of the same model was taken and these entered service in 2012. A further 15 three-section trams and 5 four-section trams were ordered in 2016, the first of which was delivered in April 2018, all delivered with delays in 2021. In May 2025, after a break of approximately 40 years, the construction of the first new tram track began, extending tram line 7 by 2.2 km from the "Dole" shopping center to Višķu Street, and was completed in 2026.

=== Tram lines ===
| Number | Start point | End point |
|---|---|---|
| 1 | Jugla | Imanta |
| 5 | Iļģuciems | Mīlgrāvis |
| 7 | Ķengarags | Ausekļa iela |
| 8 | Tapešu iela | Mīlgrāvis |
| 10 | Bišumuiža | Riga Central Market |
| 11 | Mežaparks | Ausekļa iela |
| 14 | Iļģuciems | Ķengarags |

=== Current fleet ===
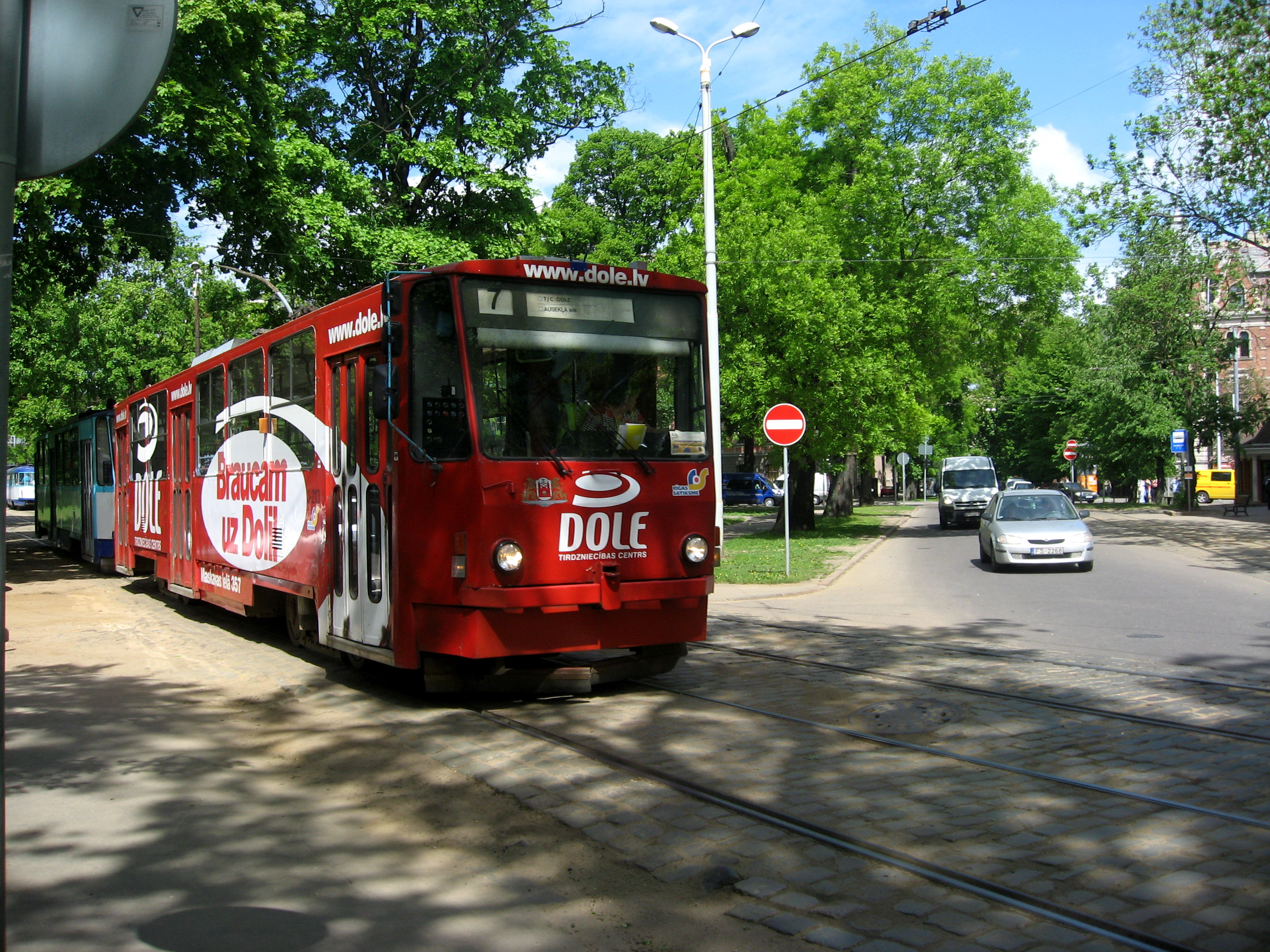
Tatra T6B5 (T6B5SU)

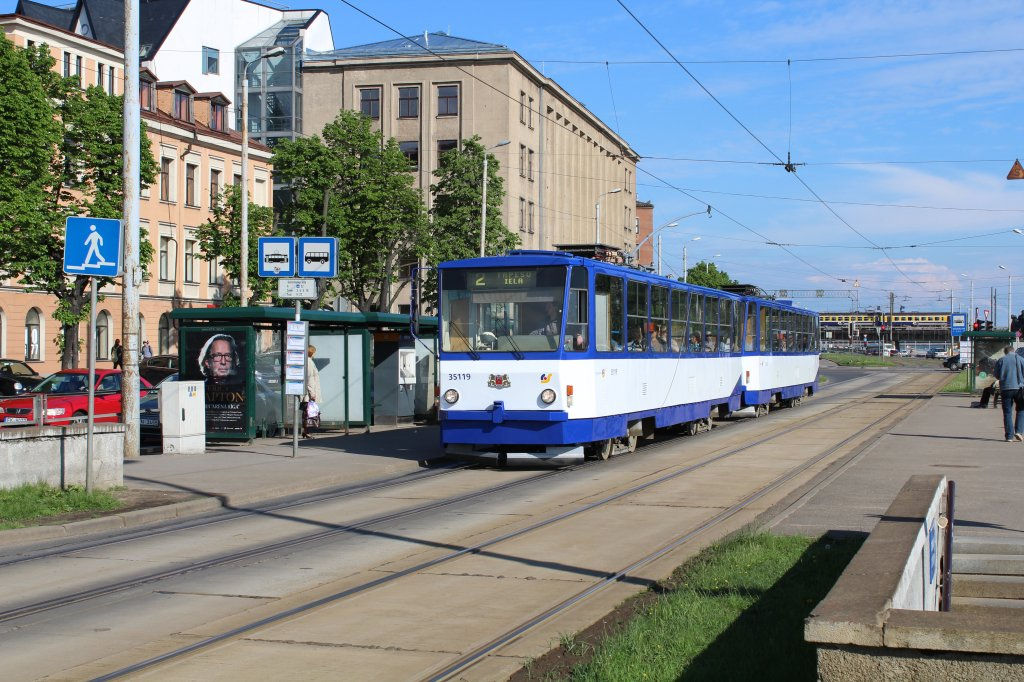
Tatra T6B5MR (T6B5R)

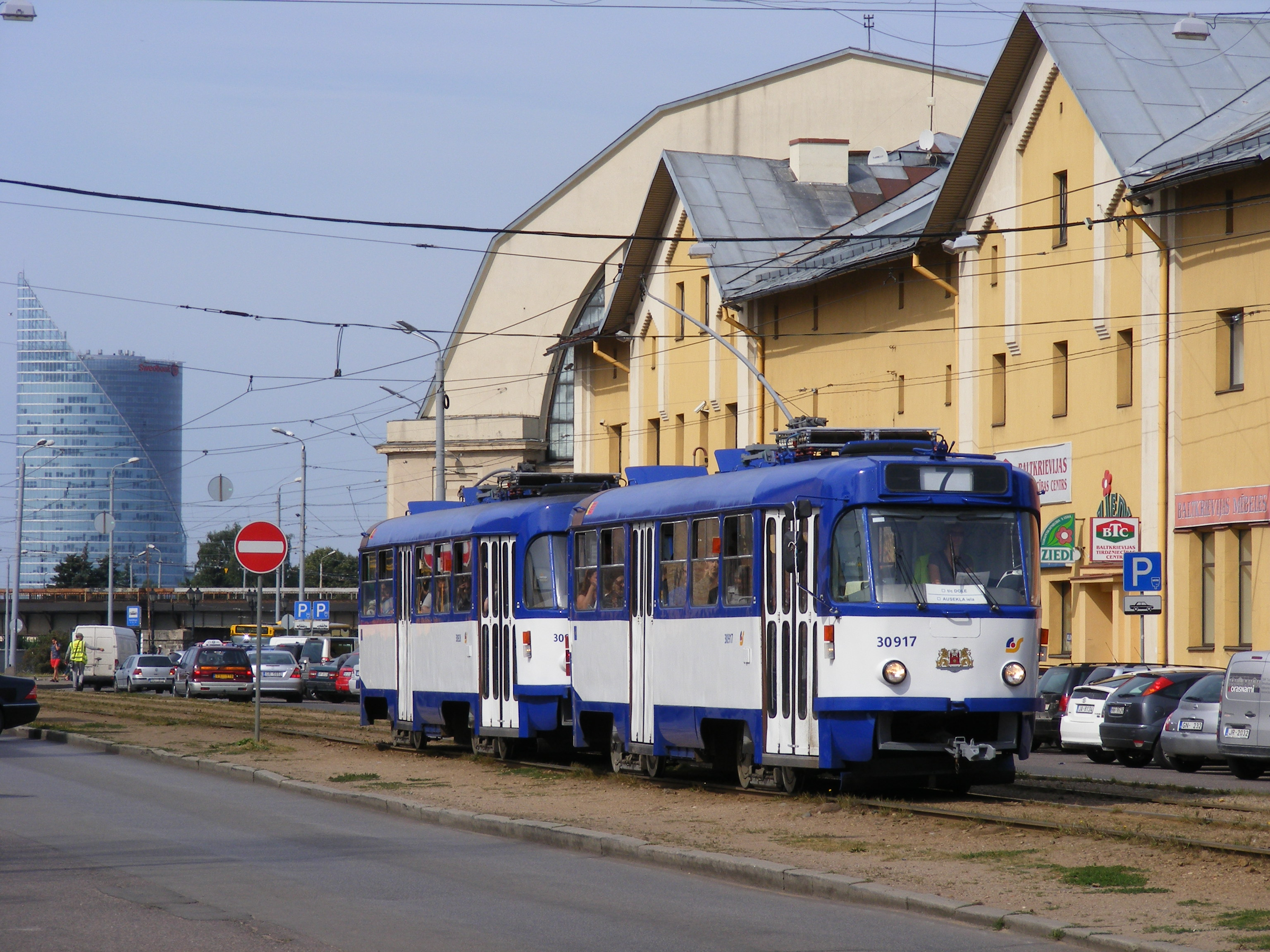
Tatra T3 (T3SU) (Tatra T3A)

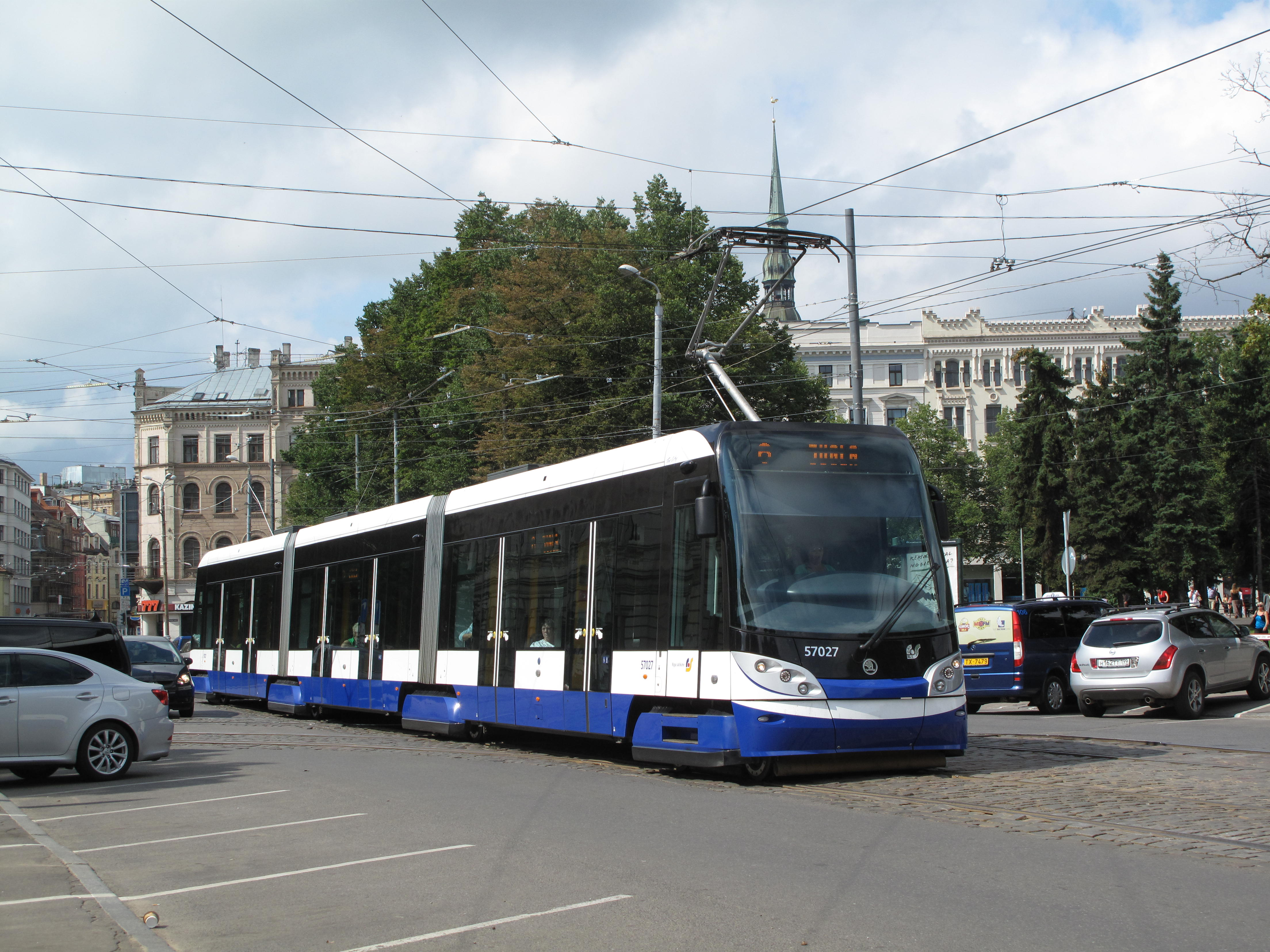
Škoda 15T Riga (ForCity)

== Fares ==
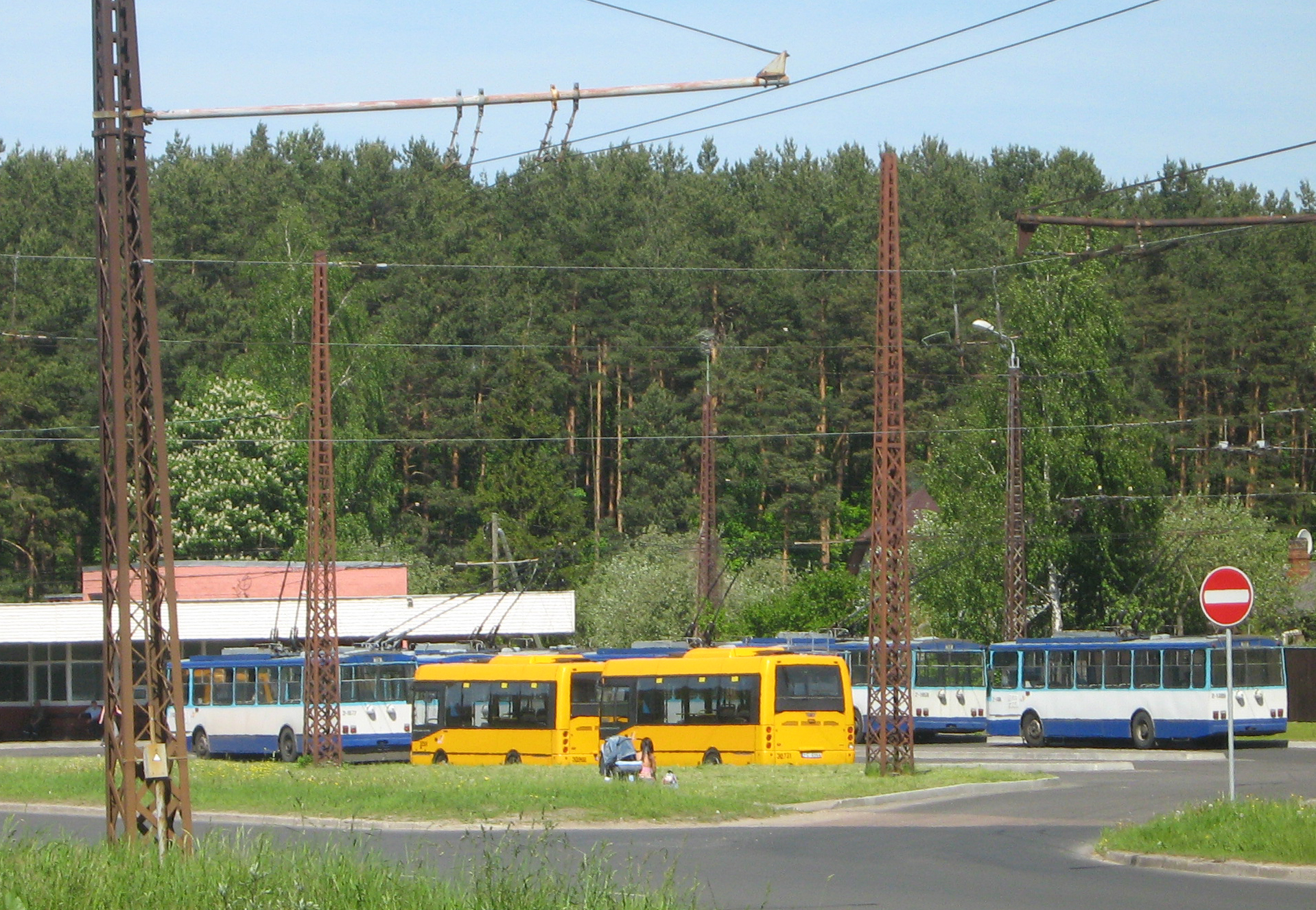
Various

=== Ticket types ===
==== Time ticket ====
A Time ticket is valid for a certain amount of time-90 minutes on all Rīgas Satiksme bus, trolleybus and tram services within the city boundaries. The ticket costs 1.50 EUR. The ticket can be bought at ticket machines and as a Code ticket.

==== Code ticket ====
A Code ticket is a method of payment in "Rīgas satiksme" public transport (tram, trolleybus, bus), which allows to make payments for the trips with a smartphone in online mode. The code ticket will work parallel with the existing e-ticket system. In order to use the code ticket, the customers will have to install a mobile application on their smartphones. Applications which can be downloaded: "Rīgas satiksmes" lietotne braucienu biļešu iegādei (GooglePlay and App Store), Timey (GooglePlay, App Store), Mobilly (GooglePlay, App Store and AppGallery).

To use the ticket, You must open the downloaded application and buy a One-month, Time and a Day ticket. When entering the public transport, scan the code or enter the identification number. In case of ticket control, present scanned ticket to the controller.

==== Day ticket ====
A ticket for a certain period of time – 24 hours, 3 days, 5 days. 24-hour ticket costs 5.00 EUR, 3-day ticket costs 8.00 EUR and 5-day ticket costs 10.00 EUR. The ticket can be bought at ticket machines and as a Code ticket.

==== One-month ticket ====
A One-month ticket is valid for 1 month from the first day of registration on all Rīgas Satiksme bus, trolleybus and tram services within the city boundaries. The one-month ticket costs 30.00 EUR. For passenger groups benefiting from a Riga City Council fare discount, except students of higher education institutions, the ticket costs 15.00 EUR. For students the ticket costs 12.00 EUR. The ticket can be bought at ticket machines and as a Code ticket.

==== Bus No. 22 ====
Bus route No. 22 is the only route managed by "Rīgas satiksme", where the ticket can also be bought from the transport vehicle driver. Payment for the ticket is with a bank payment card only, ticket price - 1.80 EUR. On bus route No. 22, it is also possible to use the other types of tickets available in advance sale outlets, and to use the travel fare reliefs.

There are also different fares for regional bus services, depending on the destination.

Public transport in Riga used conductors for fare collection until 2008.

== Scandals ==
In early 2013, Leonards Tenis, former transport advisor to the Mayor of Riga and deputy chairman of the Rīgas Satiksme council, was charged with repeatedly accepting large sums of bribes in the so-called German Daimler AG EvoBus bribery affair, in which Daimler bribed Tenis and various other Riga city council officials to win tenders for the purchase of public transport services between 2002 and 2006.

In 2013 police detained an employee of Rīgas Satiksme on the suspicion that he had raped multiple underage girls and filmed pornographic scenes with them, as well as coerced approximately 200 underage girls via social networking websites. He was accused of committing 42 sexual crimes against 20 underage girls from 2009 to 2013. In May 2015 another employee of Rīgas Satiksme was detained for gathering pornographic material of underage boys.

On 1 February 2015 the Latvian Television analytical news program "Nothing Personal" reported that Rīgas Satiksme may be involved in a fraud scheme related to the company's procurement of detergents and other cleaning aids in 2013 and 2014, when plain water was supplied instead of the ordered nanotechnological detergents. In response to the report, Rīgas Satiksme set up a disciplinary investigative commission that performed an inquiry and reported not finding any violations in the procurement process.

On 14 December 2017 four people were charged in what became infamously known as the "nanotechnology case" for a large-scale fraud causing 700 000 EUR loss to the company. Among them was an official who was accused of "improper use of the service for gracious purposes, which has had serious consequences", while criminal proceedings had been initiated against two more officers, but Rīgas Satiksme was recognised as a victim in the case. On 4 July 2018 the public prosecutor issued a warning to Riga City Council and Rīgas Satiksme for the procurement procedure of nanotechnology chemicals not complying with the requirements of the law.

On 1 October 2018 police searched the offices of Rīgas Satiksme in relation to a launched criminal investigation over suspected large-scale fraud in the company. Two days later the prosecutor's office confirmed that the searches were a part of a separate criminal case derived from the "nanotechnology case".

On 11 December 2018, Corruption Prevention and Combating Bureau carried out more than 30 searches in the offices of Rīgas Satiksme and the Rīga City Council and detained 6 people in Latvia, including Rīga Satiksme Infrastructure Maintenance and Development Department director Igors Volkinšteins and businessman Māris Martinsons and 2 in Poland in cooperation with the Poland's Central Anti-Corruption Bureau. Two days later Riga Vidzeme District Court arrested 3 more people – Škoda Transportation Sales Area Director Vladislav Kozák, Honor to serve Riga party member and one of largest Harmony donors Aleksandrs Krjačeks and Edgars Teterovskis. The same day the board of Rīgas Satiksme resigned. Mayor of Riga Nils Ušakovs suspended the head of Rīgas Satiksme, Leonīds Bemhens and appointed a temporary board, led by Anrijs Matīss. The next day Bemhens was detained by the Corruption Prevention and Combating Bureau. On 17 December deputy mayor of Riga Andris Ameriks announced his resignation.

On 28 February 2019, Pūce demanded Ušakovs to provide a detailed overview for the state of Rīgas Satiksmes' financial affairs and planned steps to stabilize the situation in the company after the interim chairperson of Rīgas Satiksme Anrijs Matīss announced the same day that the company would need 37 million euros in March to avoid insolvency. On 5 March Matīss resigned due to lack of support for changes in the company from Ušakovs and was replaced by Ernests Saulītis. On 8 March 2019, Corruption Prevention and Combating Bureau detained a member of the Honor to Serve Riga, board member of Rīgas Karte and an official of Rīgas Satiksme Aleksandrs Brandavs on suspicion of bribery.

== See also ==
- Pasažieru vilciens (Commuter rail & national passenger rail)
- Riga International Coach Terminal
