= Elachista sulcsiella =

Scientific classification
- Domain: Eukaryota
- Kingdom: Animalia
- Phylum: Arthropoda
- Class: Insecta
- Order: Lepidoptera
- Family: Elachistidae
- Genus: Elachista
- Species: E. sulcsiella

Binomial name
- Elachista sulcsiella Savenkov, 2013

Species of moth

Elachista sulcsiella is a moth of the family Elachistidae. It is found in Latvia.

== Taxonomy ==
Elachista sulcsiella was first described by Nikolay Savenkov in 2013 in the journal Zootaxa. The holotype specimen was collected in Dreiliņi, Riga (Latvia), and is housed in the Latvian Museum of Natural History (LMNH). The species is classified within the genus Elachista and belongs to the family Elachistidae in the order Lepidoptera.

Elachista sulcsiella is positioned within the Elachista bifasciella species group based on morphological characteristics, particularly of the genitalia. It shares similarities with several other Elachista species but is distinguished from them through detailed analysis of both external features and genitalia structure. It is considered to be most closely related to E. irenae (known from the Tatra Mountains) and E. talgarella (known from southern Kazakhstan).

== Description ==
Elachista sulcsiella shows sexual dimorphism, with males and females differing in appearance. Males have a wingspan of 10–11 mm. Their head, thorax, and wing-covering scales (tegulae) are grey, with the posterior margins of the tegulae appearing pale grey. Their antennae have uniformly dark grey flagella (the long, whip-like segments). Their forewings display a brownish-grey ground colour mottled with darker-tipped scales. The wing pattern is subtle, with a fascia (transverse band) that is either absent or represented by only a very indistinct small light spot. The costal spot (near the leading edge of the wing) is triangular and whitish but rather indistinct, while the tornal spot (near the inner corner of the wing) is almost square-shaped. Their hindwings and abdomens are brownish-grey, and their hind tarsi (foot segments) are pale grey with whitish rings.

Females are slightly smaller with a wingspan of 9–10 mm. Their heads feature cream-white frontal areas (frons) and neck tufts that are cream-white with darker-tipped scales. Their forewings have a dark brown ground colour that becomes paler at the apex and base. Unlike males, females display a distinct whitish fascia that curves slightly outward in the middle. Their costal and tornal spots merge to form a distinctive whitish fascia sharply angled outward in the middle.
