= Mežciems =

Mežciems (“forest village” in Latvian) is a Latvian place name that may refer to:

== Places ==
- Mežciems, Daugavpils, a neighbourhood of Daugavpils
- Mežciems, Riga, a neighbourhood of Riga
- Mežciems, Ape municipality, a settlement in Ape municipality
- Mežciems, Carnikava municipality, a settlement in Carnikava municipality
- Mežciems, Jelgava municipality, a settlement in Jelgava municipality
- Mežciems, Bracebridge, Ontario, a cottage community in Bracebridge, Ontario

== Other uses ==
- Mežciems Station, a railway station in Daugavpils
- Mežciems massacres, part of the Holocaust in Latvia
