= Yuri Krinitsyn =

Soviet serial killer

- Born: Yuri Ivanovich Krinitsyn; 1938 (age 87–88); Moscow, RSFSR
- Other names: "The Riga Upyr"; Yuri Spitsyn
- Conviction: N/A
- Penalty: Involuntary commitment

Details
- Victims: 3
- Span of crimes: January – September 1975
- Country: Soviet Union
- State: Riga
- Date apprehended: 25 December 1975
- Imprisoned at: Chernyakhovsk Special Psychiatric Hospital, Chernyakhovsk, Russia

Yuri Ivanovich Krinitsyn (Russian: Ю́рий Ива́нович Крини́цын, born 1938), known as The Riga Upyr, is a Russian serial killer, robber, and extortionist who, between January and September 1975, committed three murders in Riga. His last would-be victim, whom he planned to extort, was Latvian composer Raimonds Pauls, who aided the authorities in capturing Krinitsyn. A psychological evaluation deemed that Krinitsyn was incompetent to stand trial, and he was interned at a mental hospital.

== Early life ==
Yuri Krinitsyn was born in Moscow in 1938. Later, he moved to Riga with his family. On 13 August 1950, he and his parents travelled on the steamer Mayakovsky; the crowd on the pier did not wait for passengers to unload before climbing on board. As the boat could not withstand the load, it began to sink. In a matter of minutes, 147 people perished, including Krinitsyn's parents, but he himself was rescued. However, as his brain had trouble receiving oxygen for a prolonged period before he could be resuscitated, this caused him severe stress, which later led to him being diagnosed with reactive psychosis. As an adult, Krinitsyn found a job at the magnetohydrodynamics design bureau in Riga and got married, but his new wife often had affairs and reproached him for his low salary, despite him receiving a salary of 200 roubles, which was considered high by the standards of the time. In order to release tension, Krinitsyn bought a Luger pistol from a friend and began going out into the nearby forest to shoot at targets he positioned on trees.

== Murders ==
One day, after another argument with his wife, Krinitsyn went into the forest with his gun. While walking through the forest, he noticed a parked car in a clearing, with the driver sleeping inside. Krinitsyn tried to shoot the driver, but the gun misfired and so Krinitsyn hurried away.

In January 1975, Krinitsyn got into the car of private taxi driver with the surname Mekkers, a former spy for Nazi Germany who lived in the Latvian SSR illegally under a false name, having fled his homeland to escape being drafted into the army. Krinitsyn approached him and offered to take him to the forest, where he shot Mekkers in the back of the head. After killing him, he looted 20.63 rubles from him, which he immediately spent on gifts for his wife. He then drove the car to Riga, where he left it in a conspicuous place. (Note: The order of the killings is different in the various media sources)

On 14 September, Krinitsyn committed his next crime, killing a man with the surname Markin, a senior detective of the KGB under the Council of Ministers of the Latvian SSR, by shooting him in the back of the head while he was walking along a forested path in Dārziņi. When Markin's corpse was discovered, investigators suspected that it was the work of foreign intelligence agents since the bullets used were matched to a Luger pistol, a foreign-made weapon. Krinitsyn was unaware of who his victim was.

On 27 September, Krinitsyn killed A. Serdechny, an army counterintelligence officer. He hitched a ride on the victim's car and asked for a lift to Langstiņi, and shot Serdechny in the back of the head on the way. After killing him, he drove the car and parked it in front of the KGB building in Riga's center before promptly fleeing the scene.

== Extortion of Raimonds Pauls ==
One day while waiting at a bus stop, Krinitsyn overheard a conversation between two women, who were discussing the financial status of composer Raimonds Pauls. One of the women said that for Pauls, 17,000 rubles "amounted to 17 rubles for us", inspiring Krinitsyn to plan to acquire this exact sum from Pauls, then to kill the composer after, in order to become an infamous criminal.

On 24 December 1975, Krinitsyn phoned the Pauls' residence and demanded the 17,000 rubles from the composer, threatening to kill him and his family if he refused or notified authorities. He claimed that he had killed seven people so far, and said that Pauls would become his eighth victim if he refused. After initially dismissing it as a prank call, Pauls eventually contacted an associate who worked in the police department and was convinced to participate in an operation to catch Krinitsyn.

The following day, Pauls arrived at Mežaparks at the appointed time and place, carrying a briefcase which was boobytrapped with a paint charge. He left the briefcase on the ground and quickly left, and a few minutes later, Krinitsyn arrived, checked the surrounding area, then grabbed the briefcase and running. He ran into the entrance of a nearby apartment building, where he opened the briefcase and was splashed with paint. A few moments later, he was detained by undercover operatives who were surveiling him.

During the subsequent interrogation, Krinitsyn initially denied his guilt in the extortion, claiming that he had found the briefcase by accident and that his curiosity had gotten the better of him. However, Pauls recognized him after authorities played an audio recording of the extortionist's voice, which was recorded from his wiretapped phone. After he was confronted with this, Krinitsyn confessed to the extortion, as well as the three murders he had committed over the past months. According to him, he had killed Mekkers for "desecrating the forest"; Markin for looking back at him too much and Serdechny for being asleep on the job. Krinitsyn showed the investigators where he kept his weapon, that being his shed near his wooden two-storey house on Kareivju Street. While exploring the household, authorities found multiple pistols. Krinitsyn also claimed that he would spend hours upon hours in the shed, disassembling and maintaining his pistol.

== Detention ==
Initially, Krinitsyn was deemed sane to stand trial, but during the process, his mental state grew worse at a rapid rate. He was sent for a psychiatric examination, which deemed that he was mentally unfit and thus, incapable of understanding the gravity of his actions. As a result, Krinitsyn was detained at a mental hospital, where, over the course of time, his condition deteriorated rapidly and he became unable to communicate verbally.

At present, Krinitsyn is being treated at the Chernyakhovsk Special Psychiatric Hospital in Chernyakhovsk, Russia. After the collapse of the Soviet Union, the Russian Ministry of Internal Affairs offered to return him to the newly independent Latvia, but the offer was categorically refused by the Latvian government.

== See also ==
- List of serial killers by country

== In popular culture ==
- Documentary "Bullet for the Maestro" from "The investigation was conducted..." (in Russian)
- Documentary "Kill the composer" from "Legends of the Soviet Investigation" (in Russian)

== Literature ==
- F. Razzakov. Encyclopedia of Crime: Bandits from the Seventies. 2008. — 890 с. — ISBN 978-5-699-27142-9. (in Russian)
