= Suži =

Neighborhood of Riga, Latvia

Coordinates: 57°01′N 24°13′E

- Neighbourhood of Riga
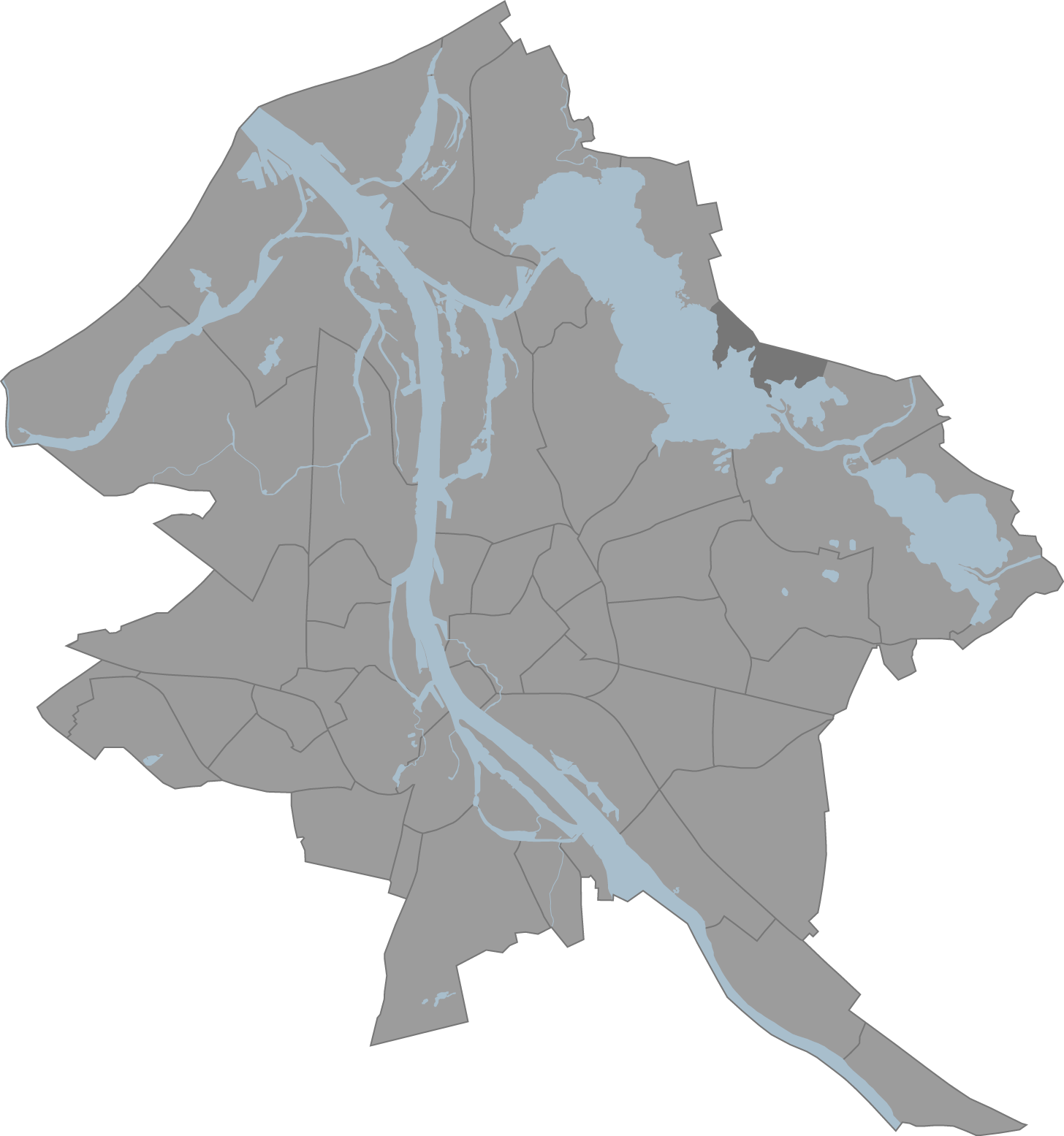
- Location of Suži in Riga
- Country: Latvia
- City: Riga
- District: Vidzeme Suburb; Northern District

Area
  - Total: 4.023 km^{2} (1.553 sq mi)

Population (2017)
  - Total: 498
  - Density: 124/km^{2} (321/sq mi)
- Website: apkaimes.lv

Suži is a neighbourhood in the Vidzeme Suburb and Northern District of Riga, the capital of Latvia. It is served by Rīgas Satiksme buses #11 and #19.
