= Šmerlis =

Forest in Riga, Latvia

Coordinates: 56°58′53.8″N 24°13′34.5″E

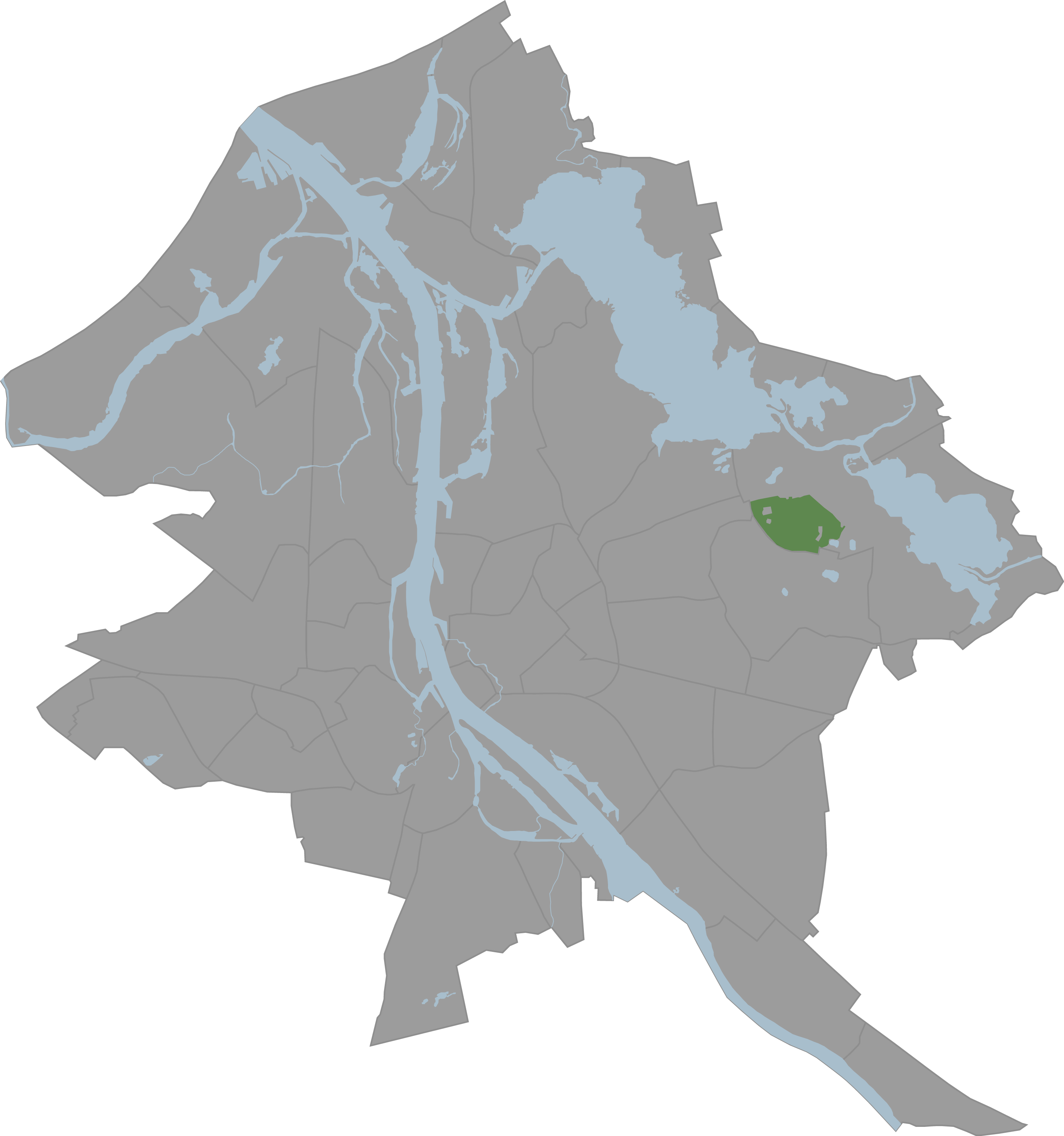
Map of the forest within Riga

Šmerlis (also Šmerļa mežs) is a forest in Riga, Latvia. It is mostly located in the neighborhood of Jugla, with a small area near the Biķernieku mežs forest is a part of Teika, with the southern edge of the forest bordering Mežciems. The Riga Film Studio is located on the outskirts of the forest.

THe name of the forest originated from the Šmerlis Manor, once located near the Latvian Academy of Sport Education.

Šmerlis can be accessed by Rīgas Satiksme trolleybus routes 4, 12, 16, 31 and 34 as well as tram route 1 and bus route 21.

The northern section of Šmerlis (located on the northern side of the Riga–Lugaži Railway and Brīvības gatve, and sometimes viewed as separate) is also the site of the only active Jewish cemetery in Riga - the New Jewish Cemetery (Latvian: Jaunie ebreju kapi or Jaunā ebreju kapsēta), established in 1920. In May 1934, the monument to 37 Jewish soldiers and officers who died fighting for the independence of Latvia in 1918-1920 was opened at the central alley of the cemetery. Other monuments dedicated to Latvian victims of the Holocaust have been built there as well.

Šmerlis is also considered to be the name of the sub-neighborhood around the forest.

== See also ==
- Biķernieki Memorial
