= Elachista talgarella =

Scientific classification
- Kingdom: Animalia
- Phylum: Arthropoda
- Class: Insecta
- Order: Lepidoptera
- Family: Elachistidae
- Genus: Elachista
- Species: E. talgarella

Binomial name
- Elachista talgarella Kaila, 1992

Species of moth

Elachista talgarella is a moth of the family Elachistidae, which is commonly found in southern Kazakhstan.
