= Iļģuciems =

Neighbourhood of Riga, Latvia

- Neighborhood of Riga
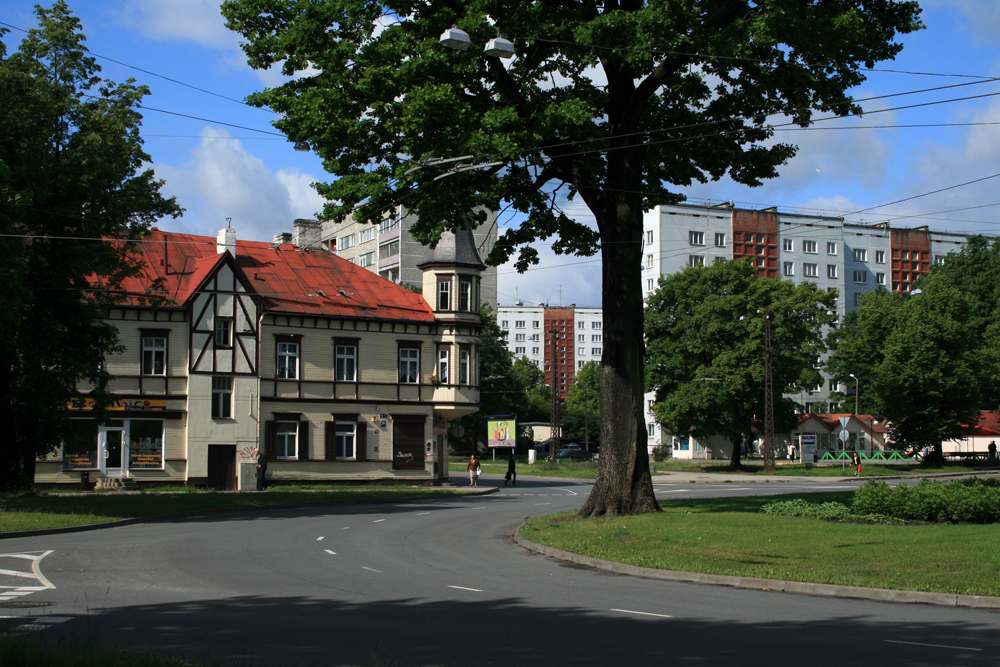
- Buļļu street in Iļģuciems

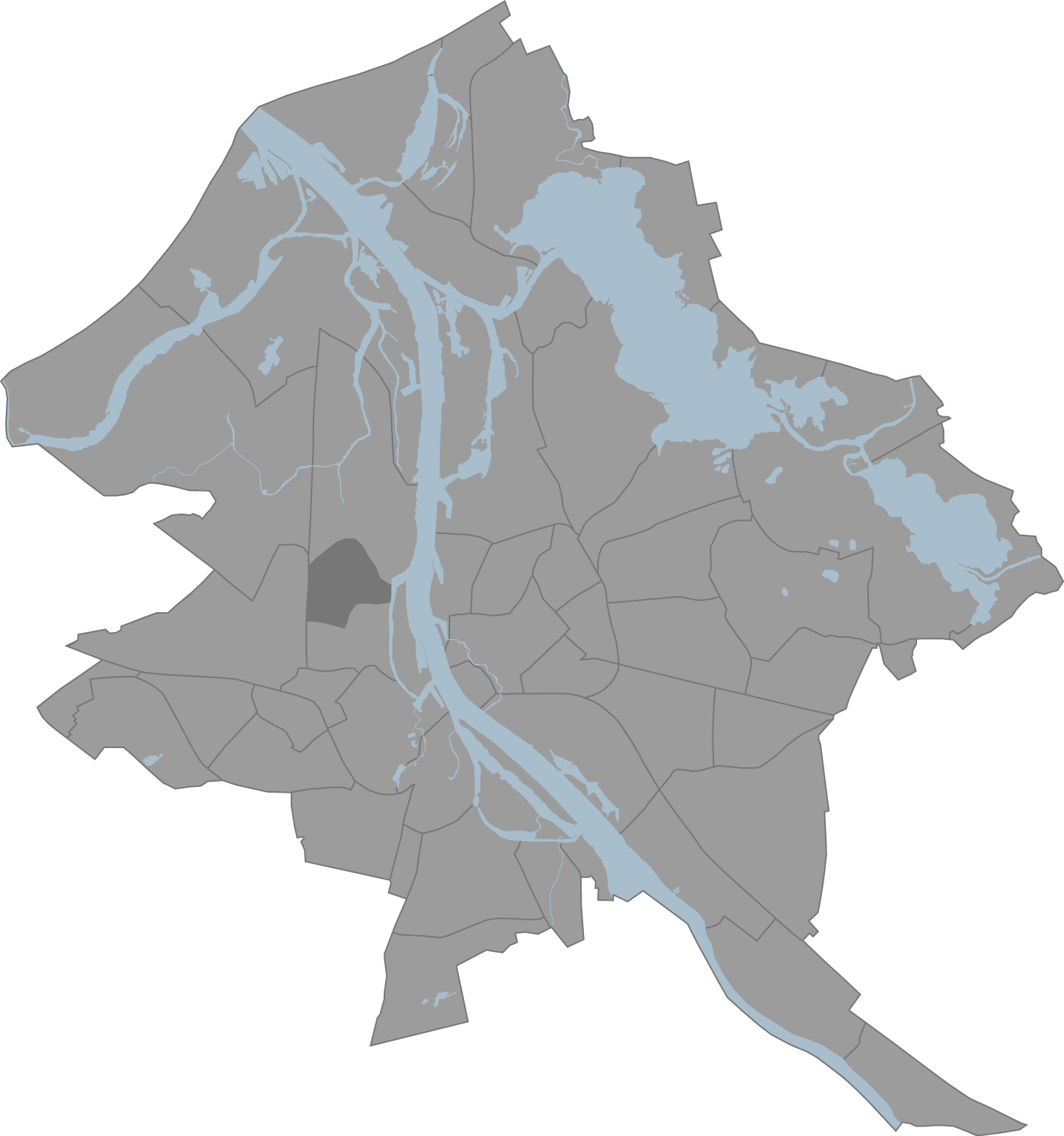
- Location in Riga
- Coordinates: 56°58′N 24°04′E
- Country: Latvia
- City: Riga
- District: Kurzemes rajons

Area
  - Total: 2.442 km^{2} (0.943 sq mi)

Population (2024)
  - Total: 20,370
- Time zone: UTC+2 (EET)
  - Summer (DST): UTC+3 (EEST)

Iļģuciems is one of the older neighbourhoods situated in the Pārdaugava side of Riga.
