= Elachista irenae =

Species of moth

Elachista irenae is a moth of the family Elachistidae which can be found in Poland and Slovakia.

Adults are on wing from the second half of June to the end of July in one generation per year.
