= Imanta =

Neighbourhood of Riga, Latvia

- Neighborhood of Riga
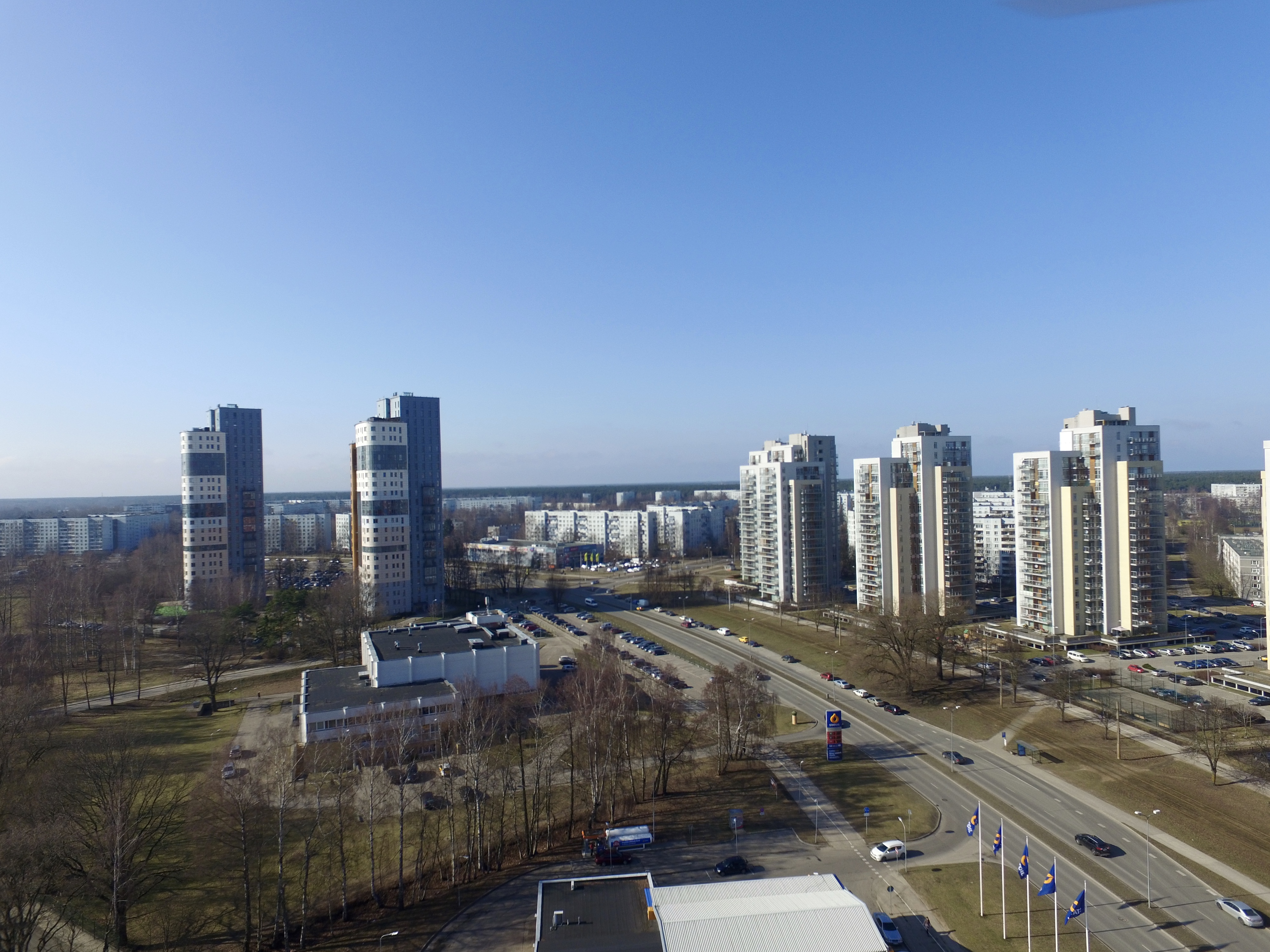
- Anniņmuižas Boulevard in Imanta

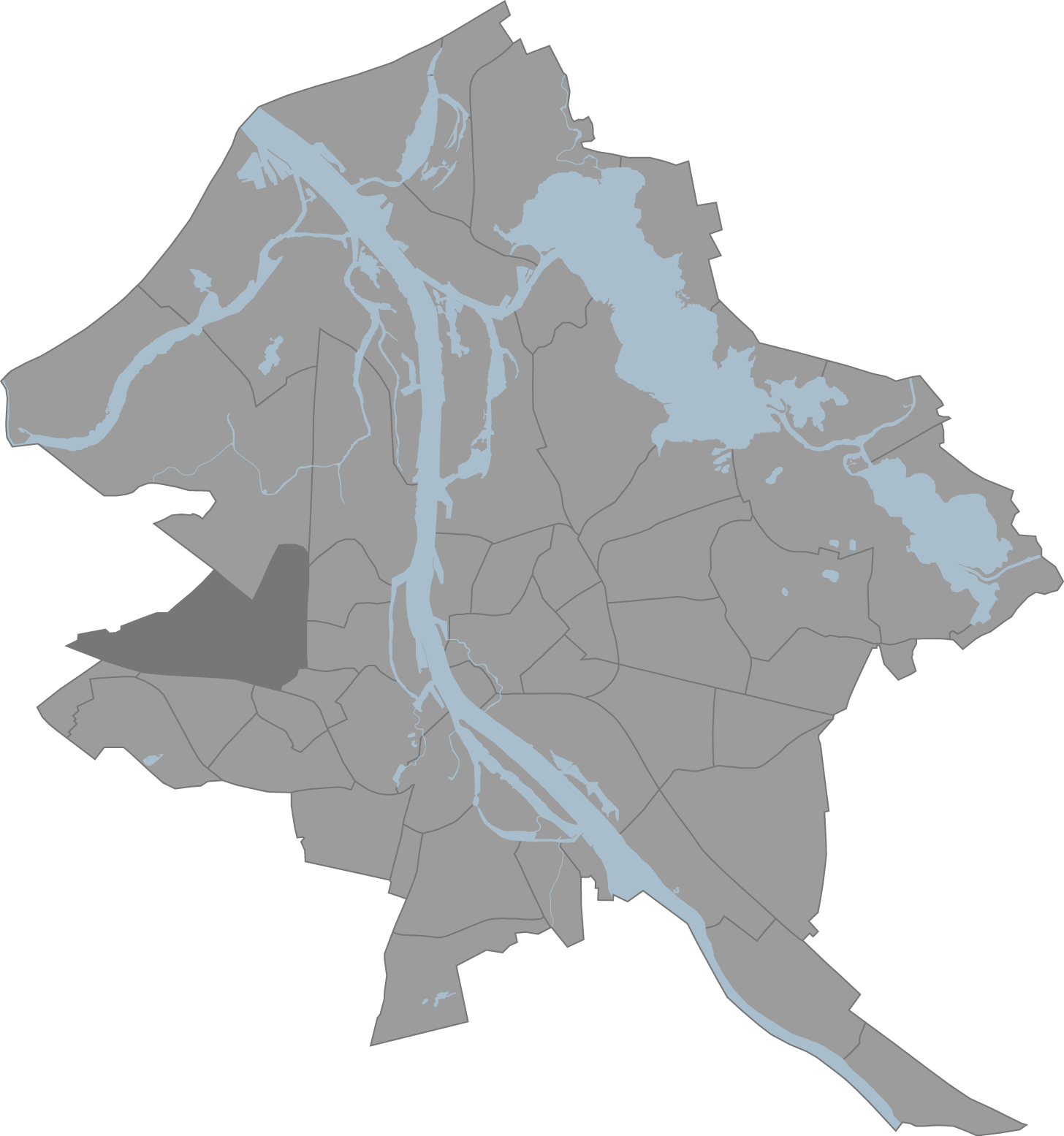
- Location in Riga
- Coordinates: 56°57′N 24°0′E
- Country: Latvia
- City: Riga
- District: Kurzeme District

Area
  - Total: 9.003 km^{2} (3.476 sq mi)

Population (2024)
  - Total: 42,266
- Time zone: UTC+2 (EET)
  - Summer (DST): UTC+3 (EEST)

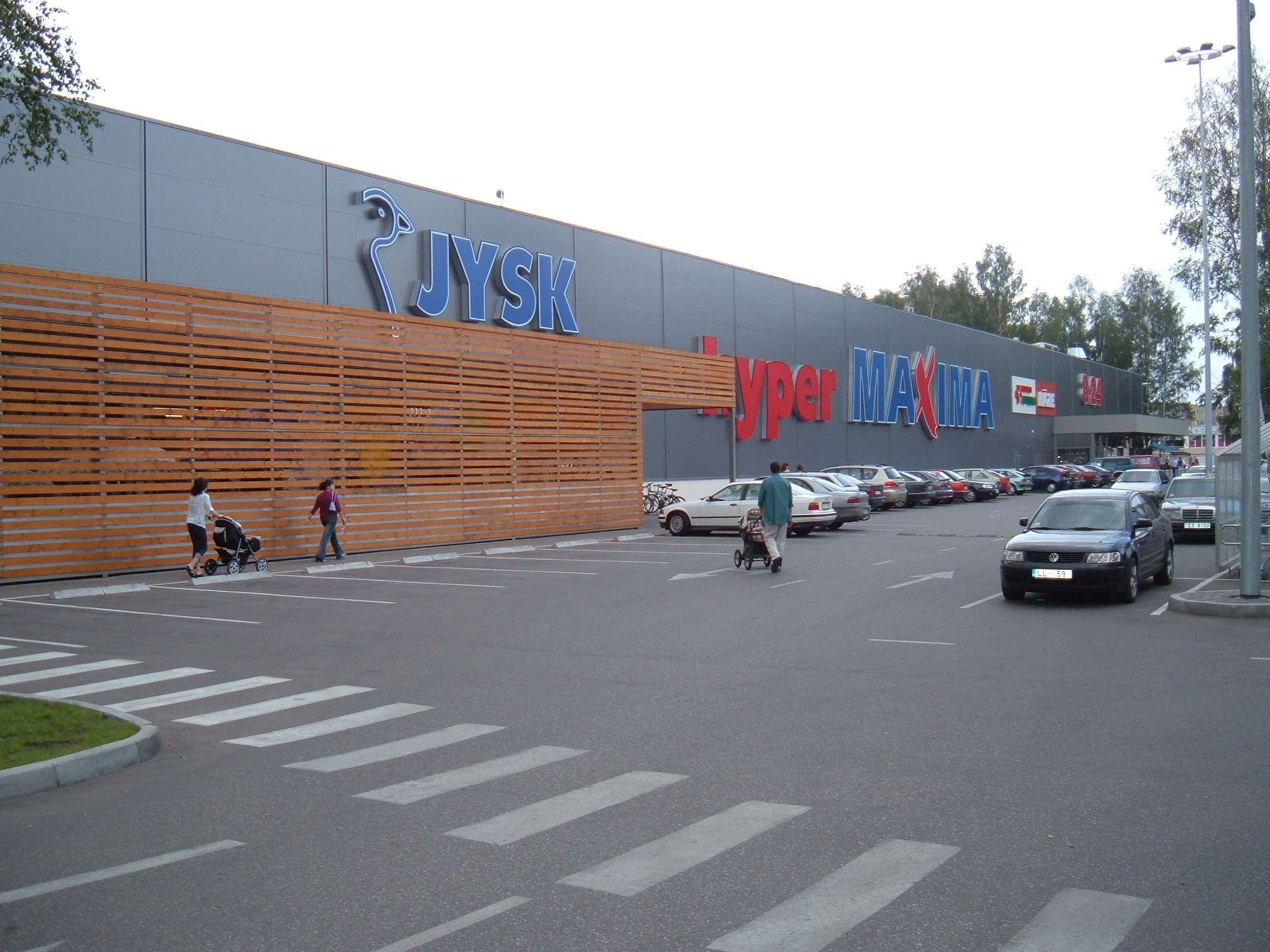
"Maxima" mall in Imanta

Imanta is a neighbourhood on the western edge of Riga, Latvia. The neighbourhood's northern border is Kurzeme Prospekts (Boulevard); and in the south, Imanta is separated from the newer Zolitūde neighbourhood by the Riga—Jūrmala railroad. Prior to development, the region consisted largely of pine forests, sections of which have been preserved in Anninmuiza Park in the center of Imanta, and the Kleistu forest to its north.
