= Mežciems, Riga =

Neighbourhood of Riga, Latvia

Coordinates: 56.9681°N 24.2361°E

Mežciems
- Neighborhood of Riga
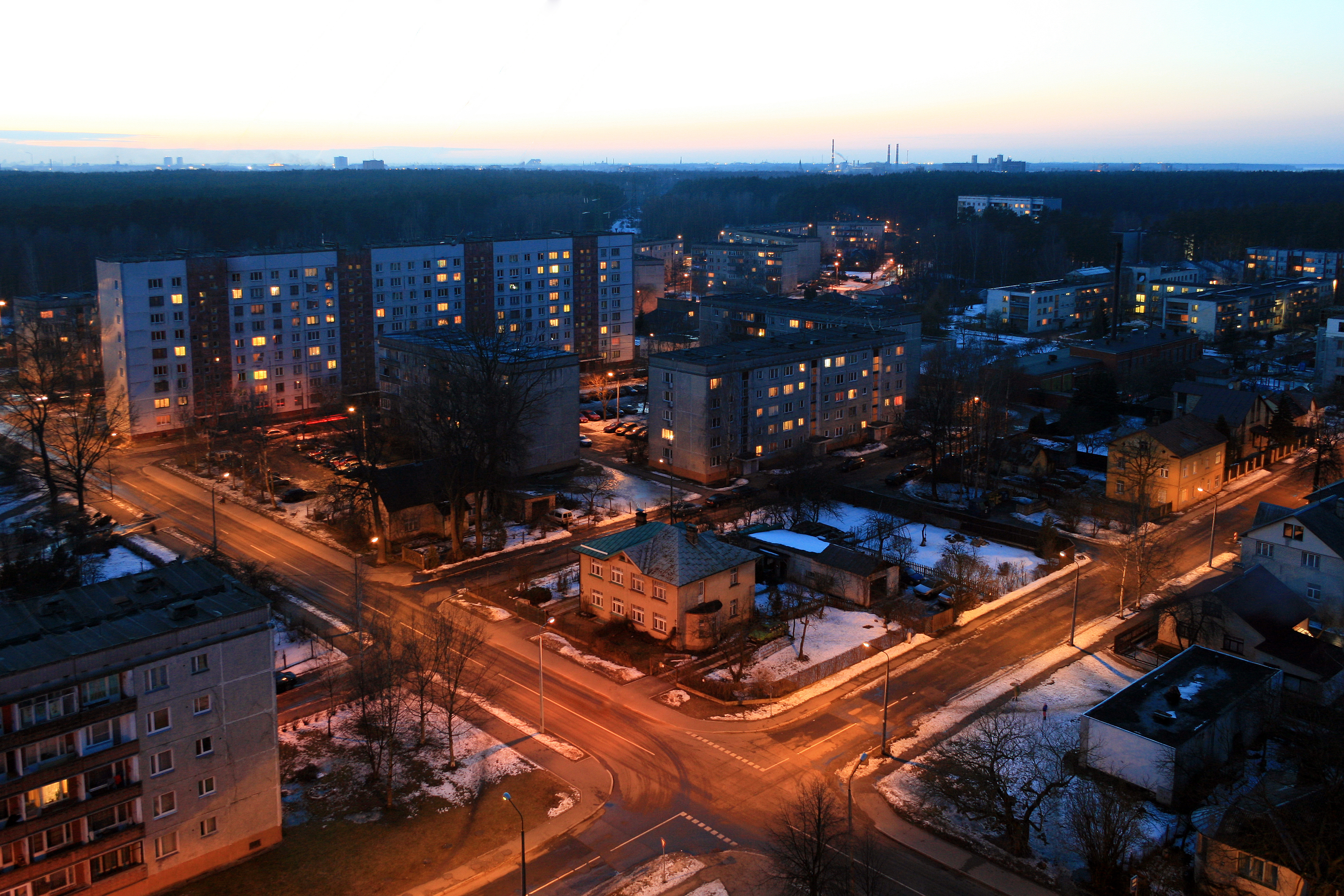
- Skyline of Mežciems

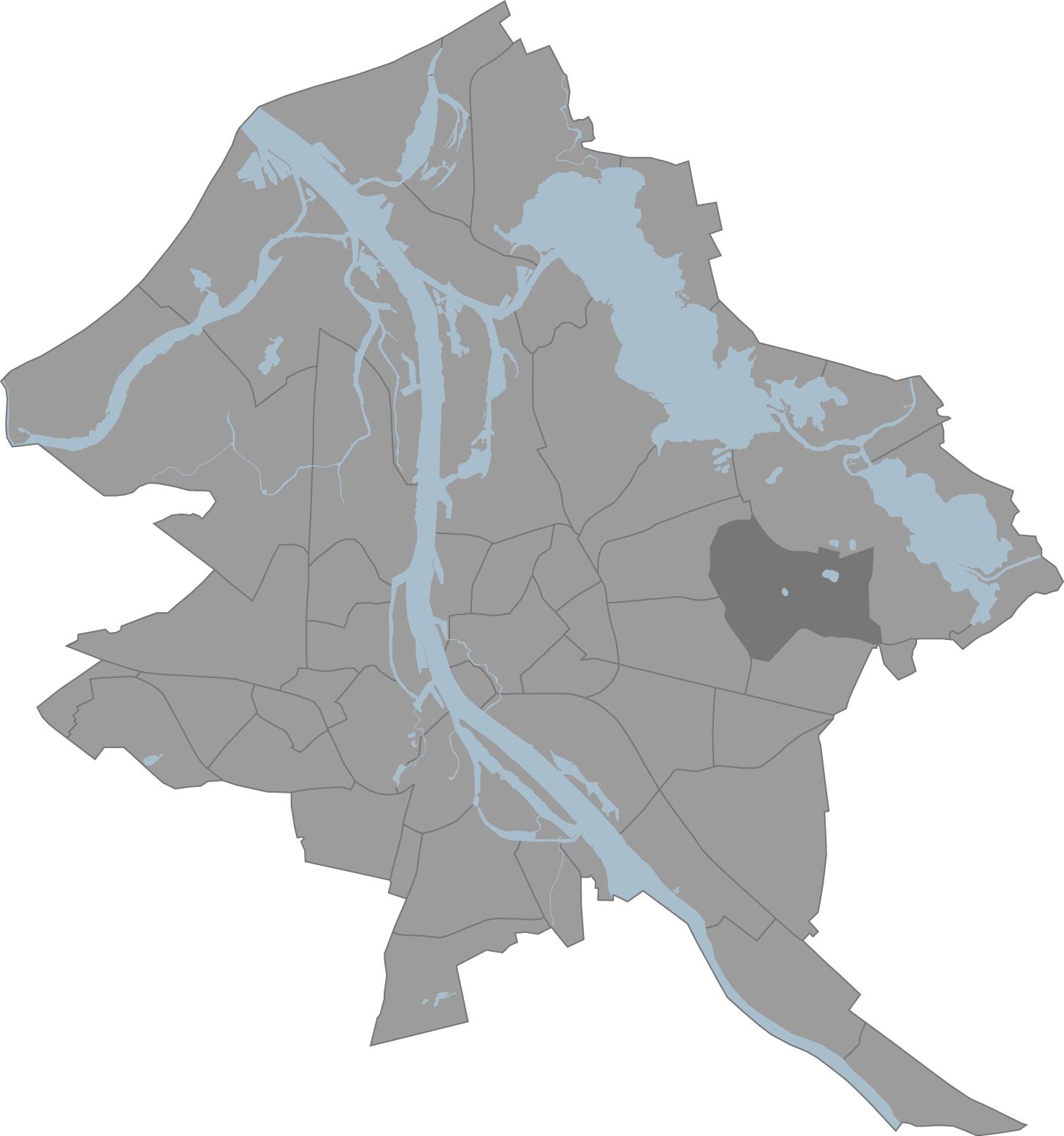
- Location in Riga
- Country: Latvia
- City: Riga
- District: Vidzeme Suburb

Area
  - Total: 7,667 km^{2} (2,960 sq mi)

Population (2024)
  - Total: 14,409
  - Density: 1.879/km^{2} (4.868/sq mi)
- Time zone: UTC+2 (EET)
  - Summer (DST): UTC+3 (EEST)
- Postal codes: LV-1079, LV-1064, LV-1038, LV-1006
- Website: apkaimes.lv

Mežciems is a neighbourhood of Riga, Latvia. The name is literally translated from Latvian as forest village. Mežciems is encircled by the Šmerlis and Jugla Forests. Lake Gaiļezers is located at the northern part of the neighbourhood. In its beginnings Mežciems was part of Dreiliņi county characterized by single-family houses.The northern part of Mežciems was included in Riga in 1934. The southern part of Mežciems was included in the city in 1974. Project of the new residential neighbourhood for 15000 people was finished in 1971. Majority of apartment blocks was constructed between 1975 and 1986. Originally the new apartments was granted to artists, medics and factory workers.

== Governing ==
Mežciems has a government-supported Mežciema attīstības biedrība development planning organization, which is part of Teika neighbourhood association, one of 7 in Riga.

== History ==
As early as the 17th century, possibly due to the large number of lakes, Mežciems was more densely populated than the surrounding areas. Between 1736 and 1743, the Gaiļa manor was established on the land of the Putniņi house, which gave the current name Gaiļezers (formerly Putniņezers). The manor itself was named after Riga landlord Hāns, who owned it since 1766. In the southern part of Mežciems, opposite the Biķernieki Church, was the Kaulu Manor, also known as Franki. The manor was established after the Great Plague, which broke out in the area around 1709, on the land of two peasant farms. One of the manor buildings at 126 Biķernieku Street has survived to this day. The adjacent buildings at 122 and 124 Biķernieku Street, which had been significantly rebuilt, were demolished in 2002. The Biķernieku Church next to the manor was built in 1765 and consecrated in 1766. Previously, there was a wooden church in the vicinity, built around 1694, which was destroyed in 1709. Next to the church is a school building and a cemetery, built around the same time, where the first burials took place as early as around 1500.

Next to Mežciems is located Biķernieki (formerly Biķeri). Historically, farmers of Biķernieki owned small farmyards with sandy or marshy fields and meadows, fishing in Lake Jugla. At the turn of the 16th/17th century, local farmers had formed a fishermen's guild, whose emblem was a cup (Latvian "biķeris") where the name likely originated. Since 1974, Biķernieki has been part of the territory of Riga.

Mežciems was originally developed as a low-rise residential area within the boundaries of the former Burharda Manor in Dreiliņi Parish. The northern part of Mežciems was incorporated into the city of Riga in 1934. The southern part, which until then had been sparsely populated and mainly agricultural land, was incorporated into the city in 1974, when the construction of a multi-story microdistrict began.

The detailed plan for the organization of the residential area of Mežciems was developed by the institute "Pilsētprojekts" in 1971. The Mežciems multi-story residential district consists of two microdistricts, a public and commercial center, which, together with other service institutions, is located on an internal pedestrian street. The development project was designed by architects Juris Paegle, Andris Kronbergs, Oļģerts Krauklis and others.

In the initial design stage of the residential area, it was planned that all buildings would be 16-story 104 series buildings, but this plan was changed in the final stage of the project's development. The high-rise buildings were constructed between 1975 and 1986 and were intended to accommodate around 15,000 residents. The Mežciems high-rise residential area consists mainly of 602 series buildings (including modified two-story apartments), Lithuanian project buildings (464 series), and a few 16-story 104 series buildings. These were originally allocated to artists, medical professionals, and factory workers.
