= Mežciems Station =

Train station in south east Latvia

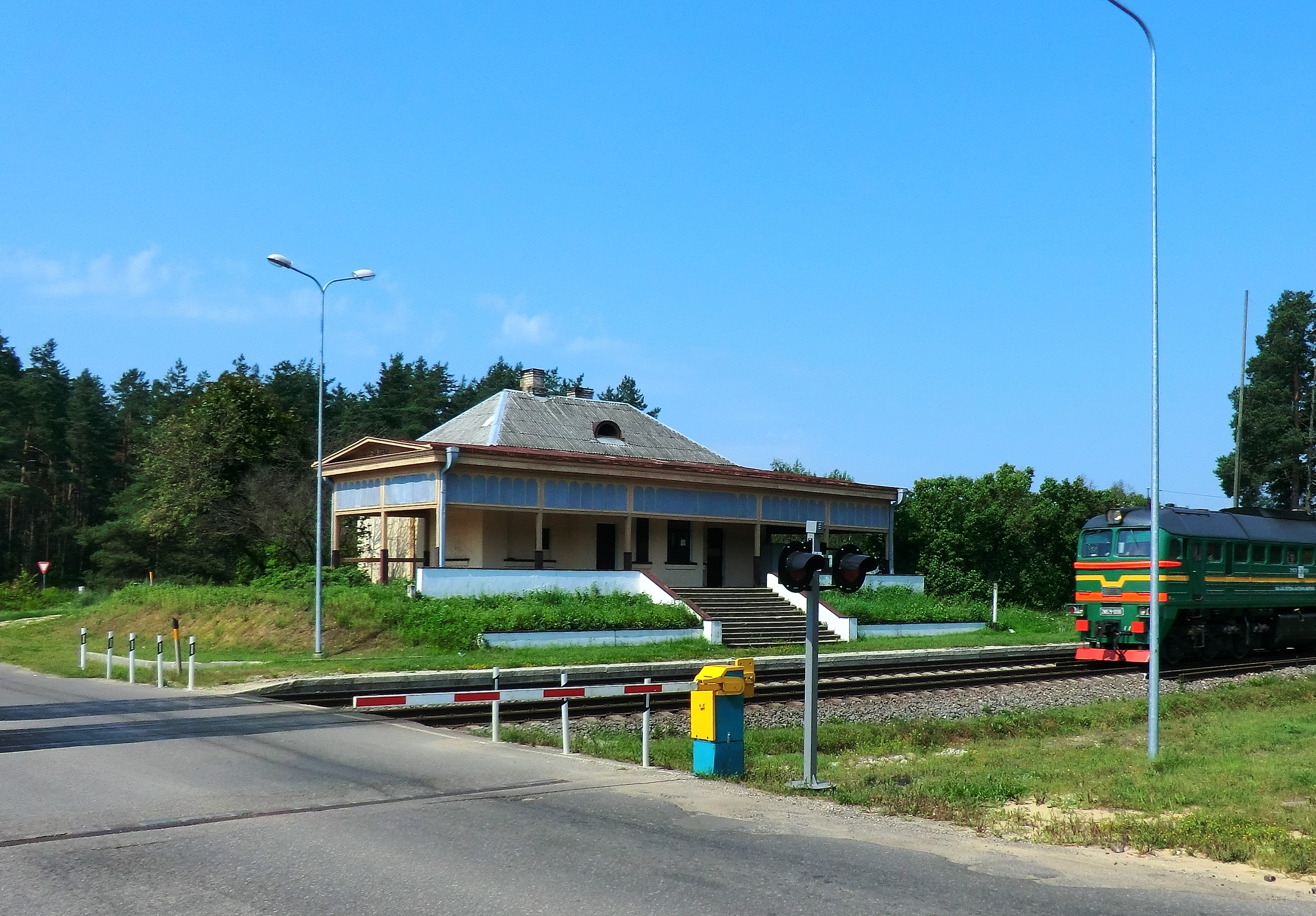
- Mežciems Station in 2012

General information
- Coordinates: 55°54′58.49″N 26°29′4.47″E

History
- Opened: 1938
- Closed: 2011
Location
- Location within Latvia railways

Mežciems Station is a railway station on the Riga – Daugavpils Railway on the outskirts of Daugavpils. Since 2011, passenger trains don't stop at the station.
