= Dārziņi =

Neighbourhood of Riga, Latvia

Coordinates: 56°51′53″N 24°16′31″E

- Neighbourhood of Riga
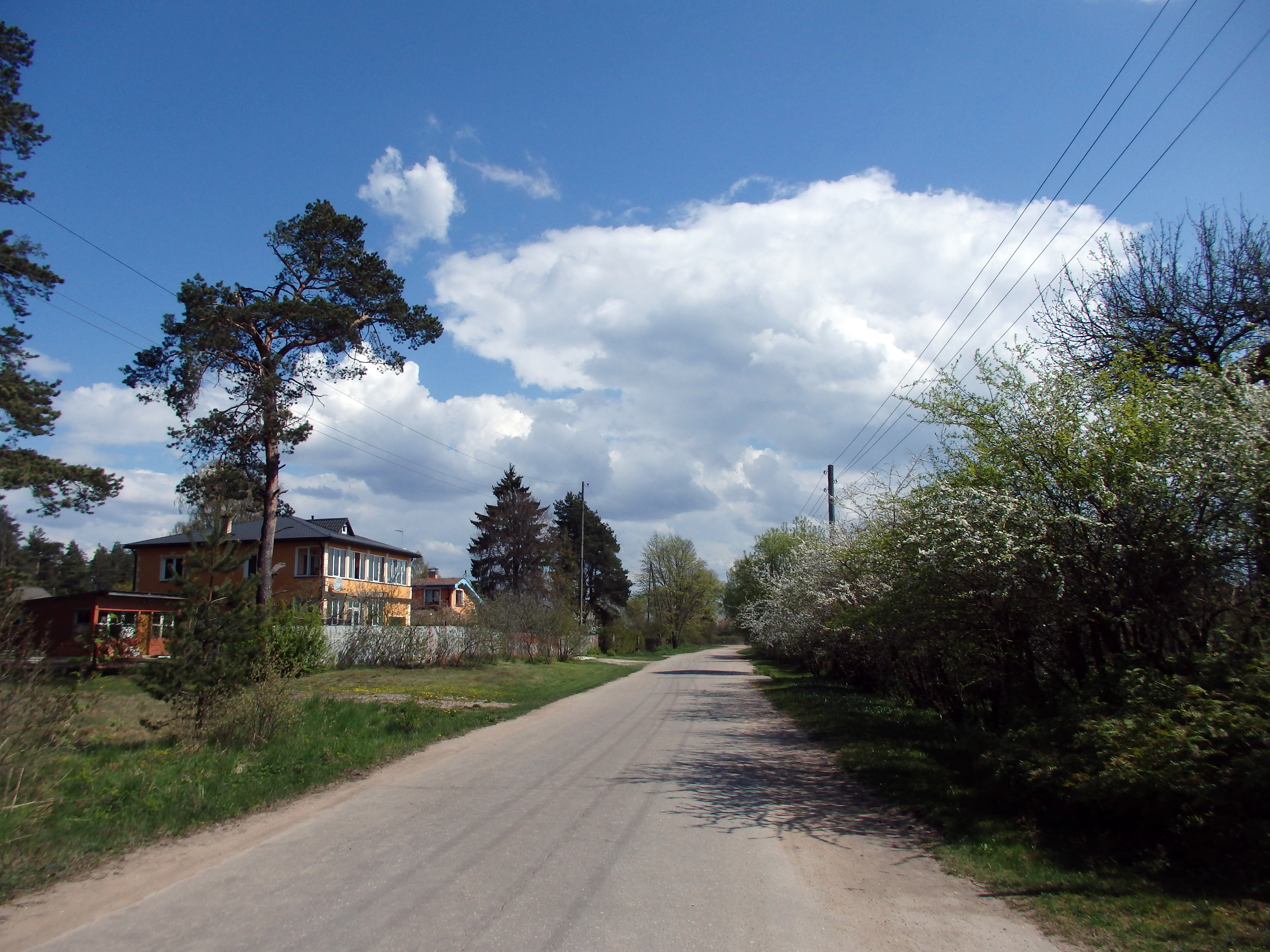
- Dārziņu iela (Dārziņi Street)

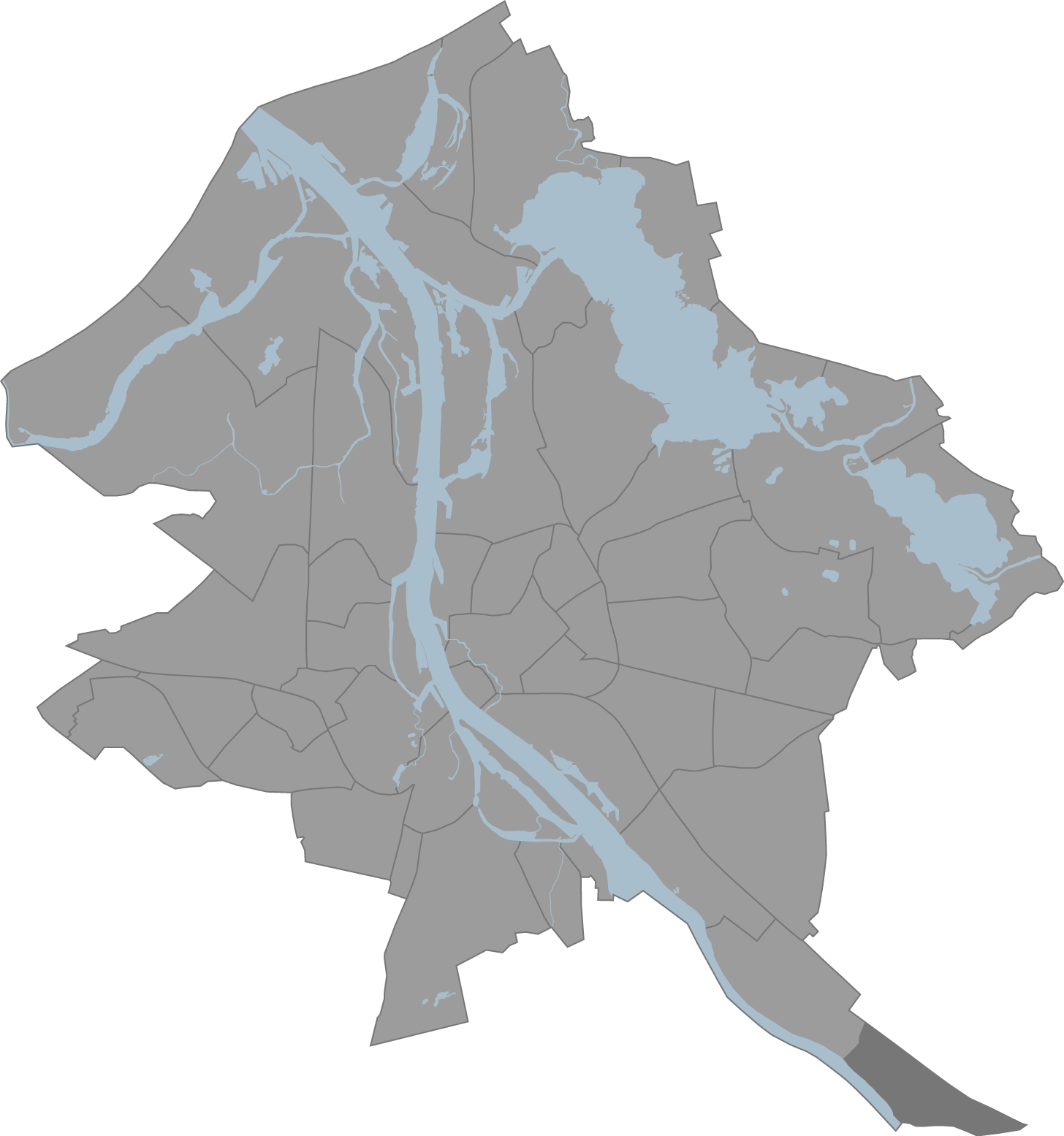
- Location of Dārziņi in Riga
- Country: Latvia
- City: Riga
- District: Latgale Suburb

Area
  - Total: 4.348 km^{2} (1.679 sq mi)

Population (2018)
  - Total: 2.768
  - Density: 0.6366/km^{2} (1.649/sq mi)
- Postal code: LV-1063
- Website: apkaimes.lv

Dārziņi is a neighbourhood of Riga, the capital of Latvia, which is located in the Latgale Suburb. The neighbourhood mostly consists of summer homes and small plant gardens for personal use, and it is the southernmost neighbourhood of Riga.

Dārziņi were added to the city of Riga in 1968.
