= Dreiliņi, Riga =

Neighbourhood of Riga, Latvia

Coordinates: 56.9511°N 24.2298°E

Dreiliņi
- Neighbourhood of Riga
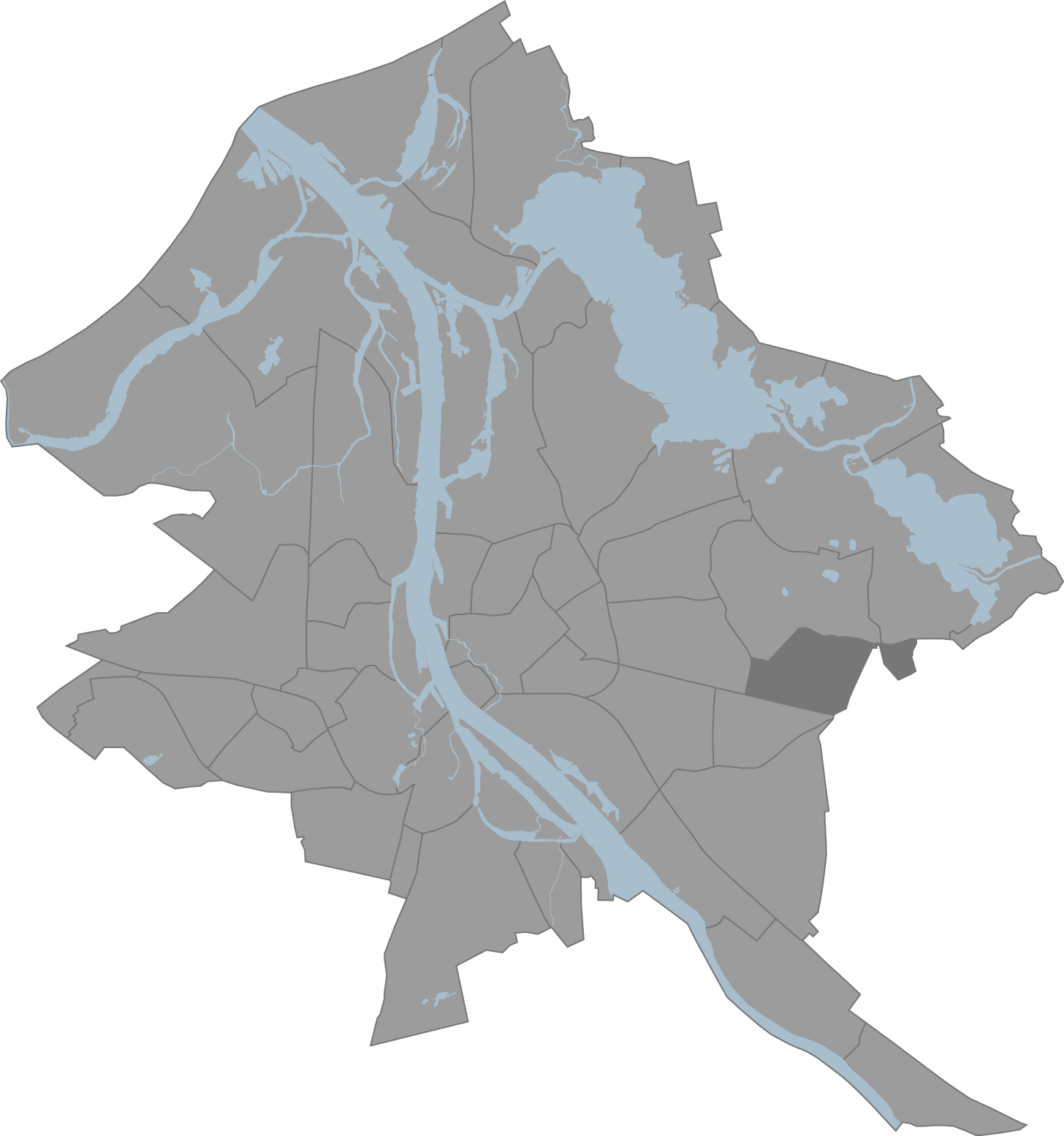
- Location of Dreiliņi in Riga
- Country: Latvia
- City: Riga
- District: Vidzeme Suburb

Area
  - Total: 4.155 km^{2} (1.604 sq mi)

Population (2024)
  - Total: 7,125
  - Density: 1,715/km^{2} (4,441/sq mi)
- Website: apkaimes.lv

Dreiliņi is a newly built neighbourhood on the eastern edge of Riga, Latvia within the Vidzeme Suburb. It lies within the borders of Augusta Deglava, Baltinavas, Dzilnas and Ēvalda Valtera streets.

Some country-style homes existed here (on Baltinavas street), but it was planned to expand this part of the city by building nine story concrete block apartments. Construction started in the late 1980s, but the first inhabitants only moved there in 2004. The buildings stood empty for more than 15 years, before the first part of this neighbourhood was finally completed in late 2006. Today, Dreiliņi is experiencing its 'second birth', as the Riga City Council has decided to build a new route for Augusta Deglava street. It is currently under construction, and it will pass directly near Dreiliņi, and will become a part of a planned Eastern motorway.
