= Zasulauks Station =

Railway station in Riga, Latvia

Zasulauks
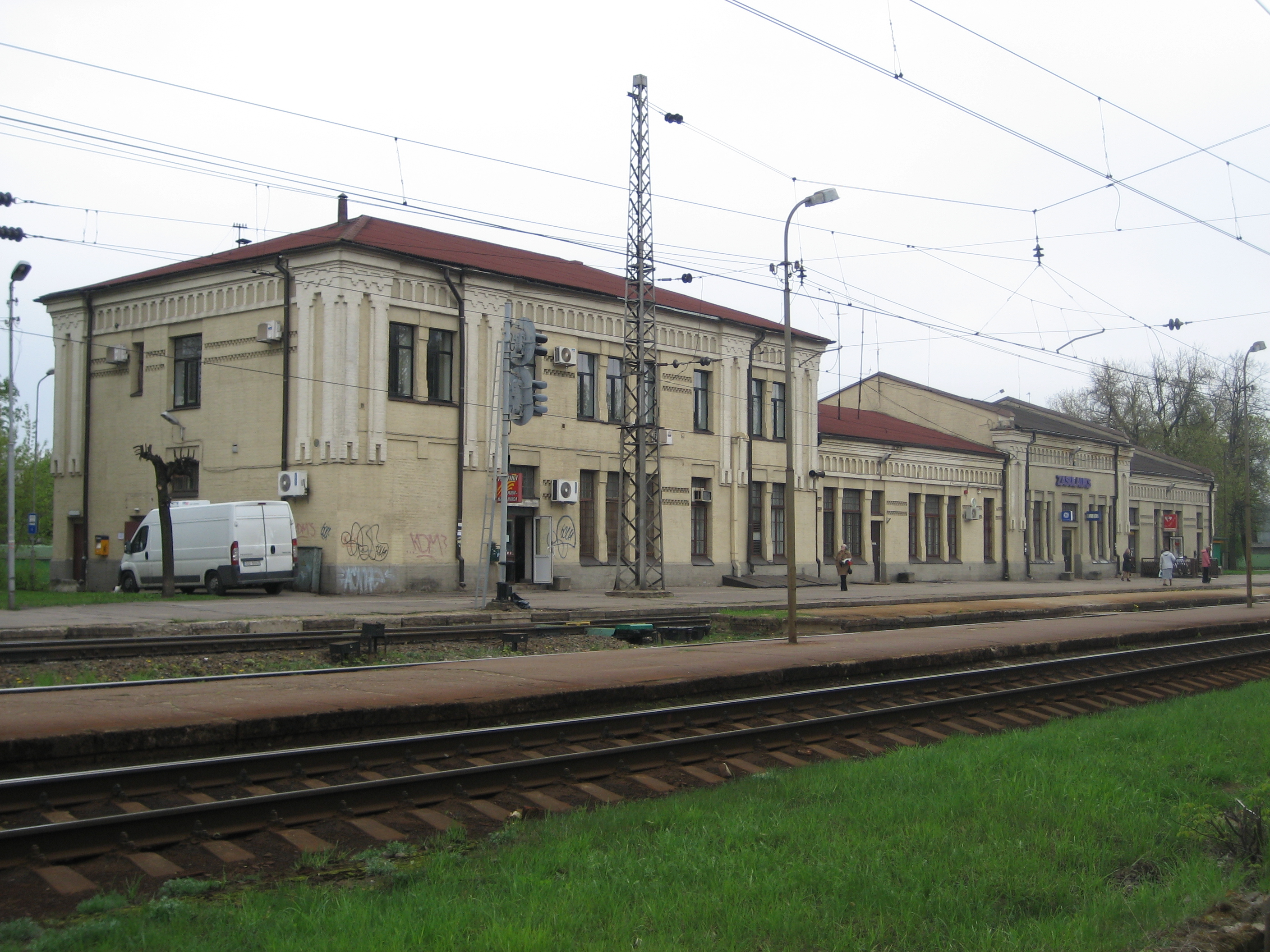

General information
- Location: Tapešu iela 1 Zasulauks, Kurzeme, Rīga; Latvia
- Coordinates: 56°56′30.30″N 24°3′5.59″E
- Platforms: 3
- Tracks: 4

History
- Opened: 1873
- Electrified: 1950

Services
Preceding station	LDz	Following station
Depo towards Tukums II	Torņakalns–Tukums II Railway	Torņakalns towards Riga
Location

Zasulauks Station is a railway station serving the neighbourhood of Zasulauks in the district of Kurzeme in Riga, Latvia. The station is located on the Torņakalns – Tukums II Railway which connects Riga with Tukums.
