= Depo Station =

Railway station in Latvia

Depo
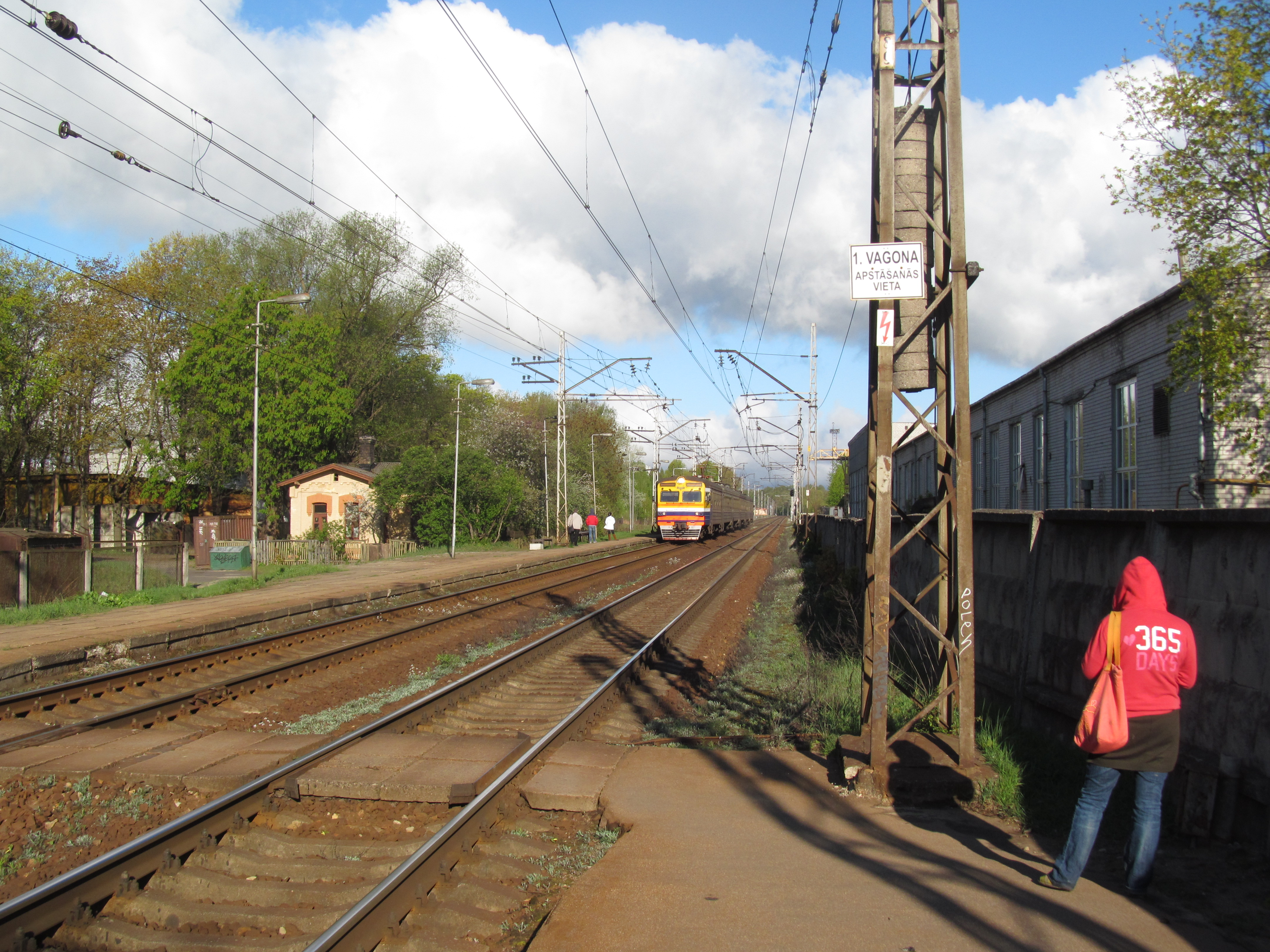
- Train to Riga approaching the eastbound platform

General information
- Location: Zasulauks, Kurzeme, Rīga; Latvia
- Coordinates: 56°56′47.83″N 24°2′24.19″E
- Platforms: 2
- Tracks: 2

History
- Opened: 1960
- Former names: Depo Zasulauks

Services
| Preceding station | LDz | Following station |
|---|---|---|
| Zolitūde towards Tukums II | Torņakalns–Tukums II Railway | Zasulauks towards Riga |
Location

Depo Station is a railway station serving the neighbourhood of Zasulauks in the district of Kurzeme in Riga, Latvia. The station is located on the Torņakalns – Tukums II Railway which connects Riga with Tukums. It's the location of Zasulauka depo (a motive power depot), which gave the station the name.
