= Zolitūde Station =

Railway stop in Zolitūde district of Riga

Zolitūde
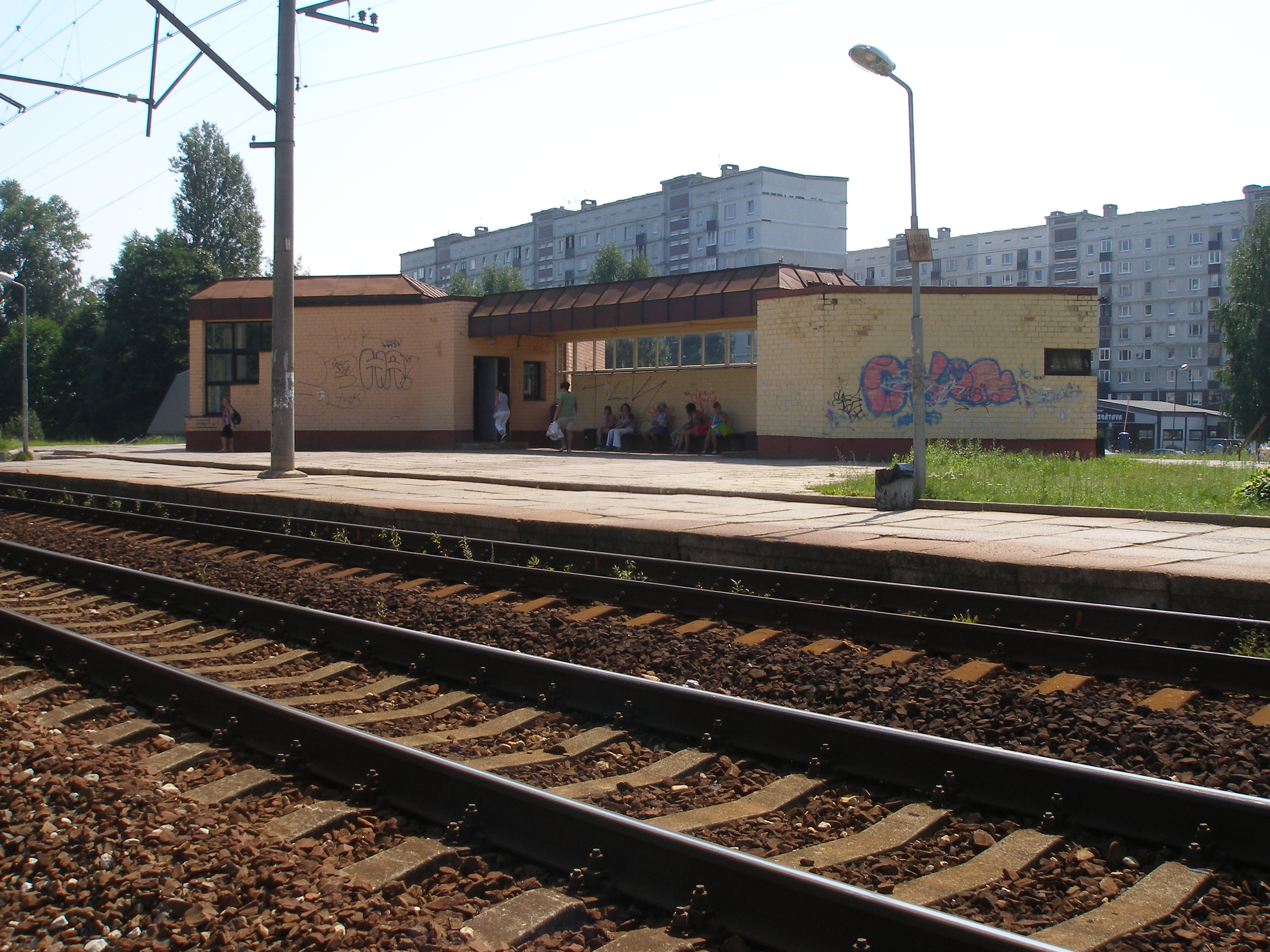

General information
- Location: Rostokas iela 61; Zolitūde, Kurzeme District, Riga; Latvia
- Coordinates: 56°56′58.87″N 24°1′11.89″E
- Platforms: 2
- Tracks: 2

History
- Opened: 1989

Services
Preceding station	LDz	Following station
Imanta towards Tukums II	Torņakalns–Tukums II Railway	Depo towards Riga
Location

Zolitūde Station is a railway station located near and named after the Zolitūde neighbourhood of the Kurzeme District of Riga, Latvia. The station is located on the Torņakalns–Tukums II Railway.
