= Imanta Station =

Railway station in Latvia

Imanta
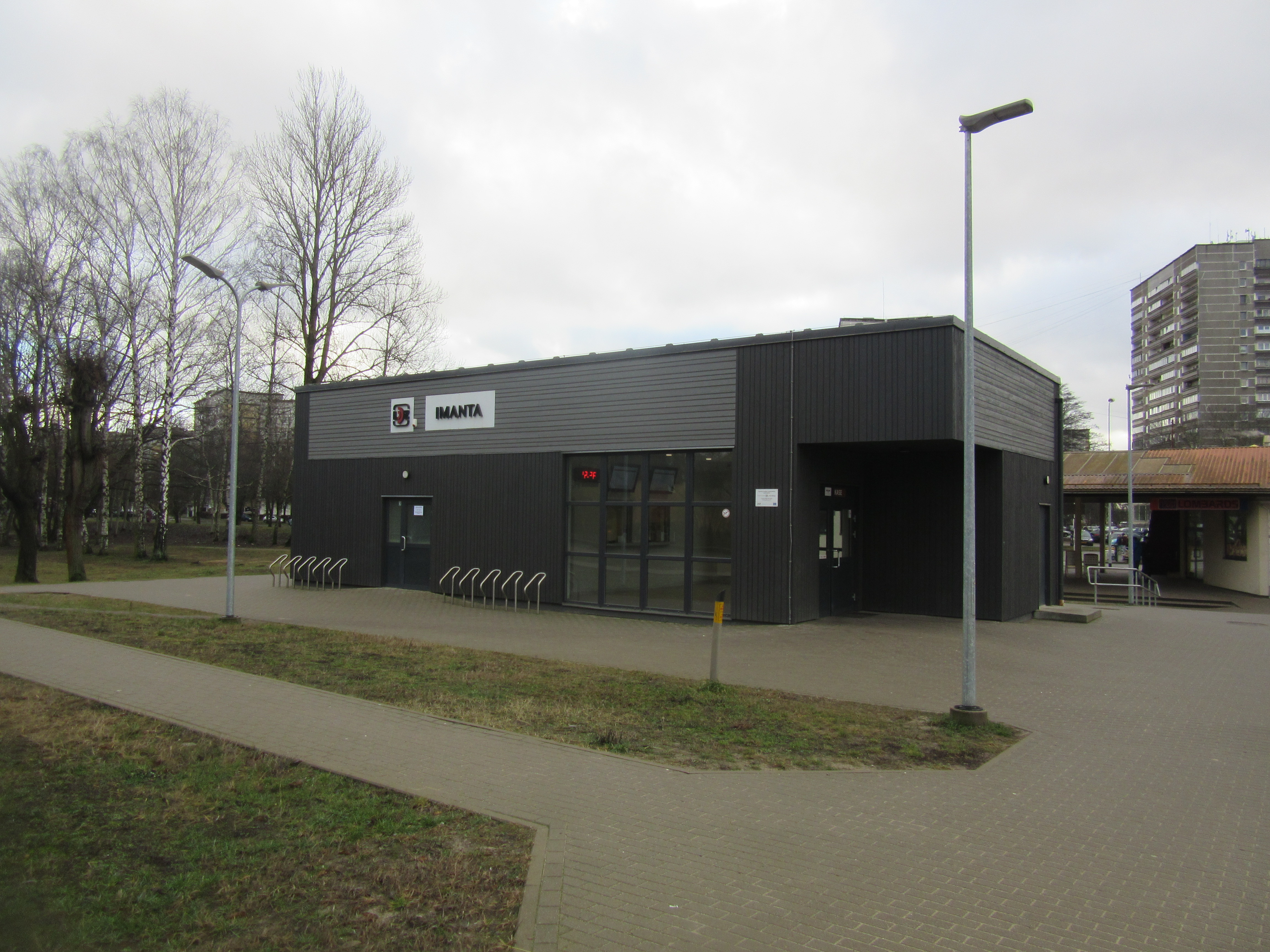
- New station building in 2020

General information
- Location: Zolitūdes iela 27; Zolitūde, Kurzeme District, Rīga
- Coordinates: 56°57′2.69″N 23°59′53.96″E
- Owner: Latvijas Dzelzceļš
- Platforms: 2
- Tracks: 2

Construction
- Cycle facilities: Yes

History
- Opened: 1894
- Former names: Zolitūde, Riga–Solitude

Services
Preceding station	LDz	Following station
Babīte towards Tukums II	Torņakalns–Tukums II Railway	Zolitūde towards Riga
Location

Imanta Station is a railway station situated near and named after the Imanta neighbourhood of the Kurzeme District of Riga, Latvia.

It is located on the Torņakalns – Tukums II Railway. All electric trains of the line stop at the station.

== History ==
The station was unveiled as Zolitūde Station (German: Solitude) in 1894 to serve the inhabitants of the local area and to transport agricultural produce and was named after the nearby Zolitūde Manor. In 1928 the station was renamed Imanta, a name which the station bears today, except the period of the German occupation of Latvia during World War II, when the station was known as Riga-Solitude.

The original station building, with some repairs, stood until March 2012, when it was demolished in preparation for renovations to the platform due to safety concerns. Major renovation works and the construction of a new station building began in November 2015. In 2016, the new building was unveiled.

== Gallery ==
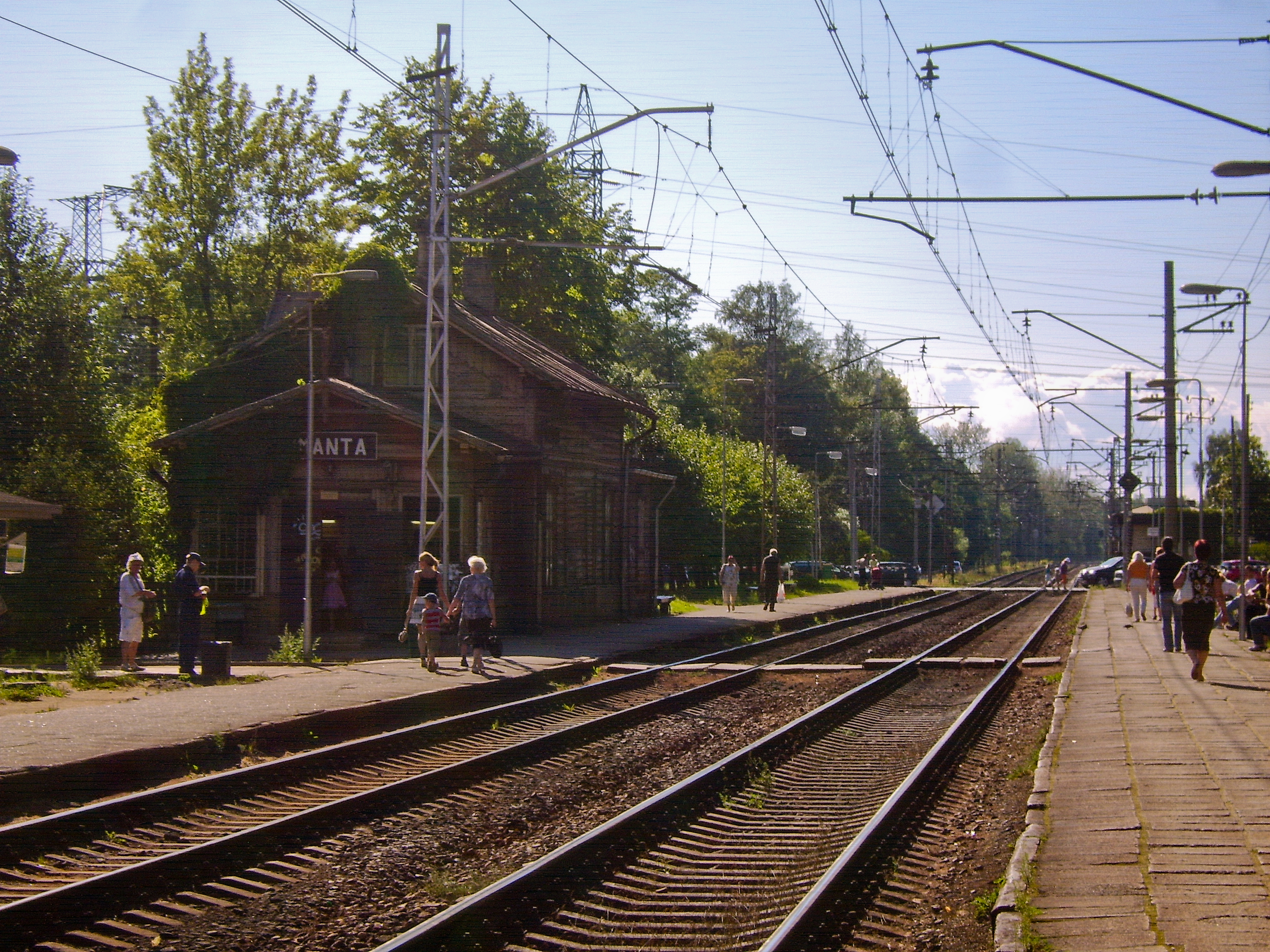
The old station building in 2005

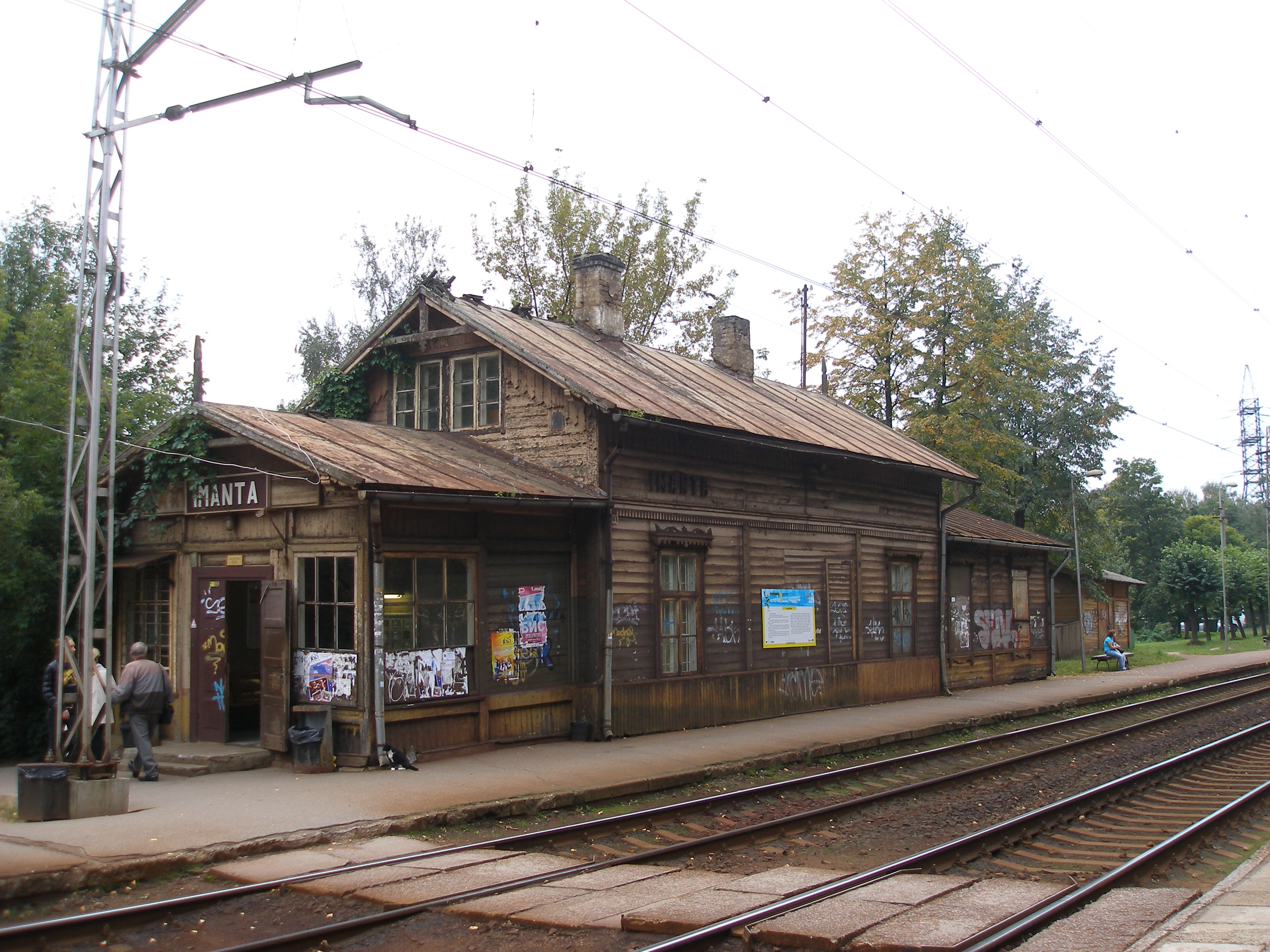
The old building in 2010

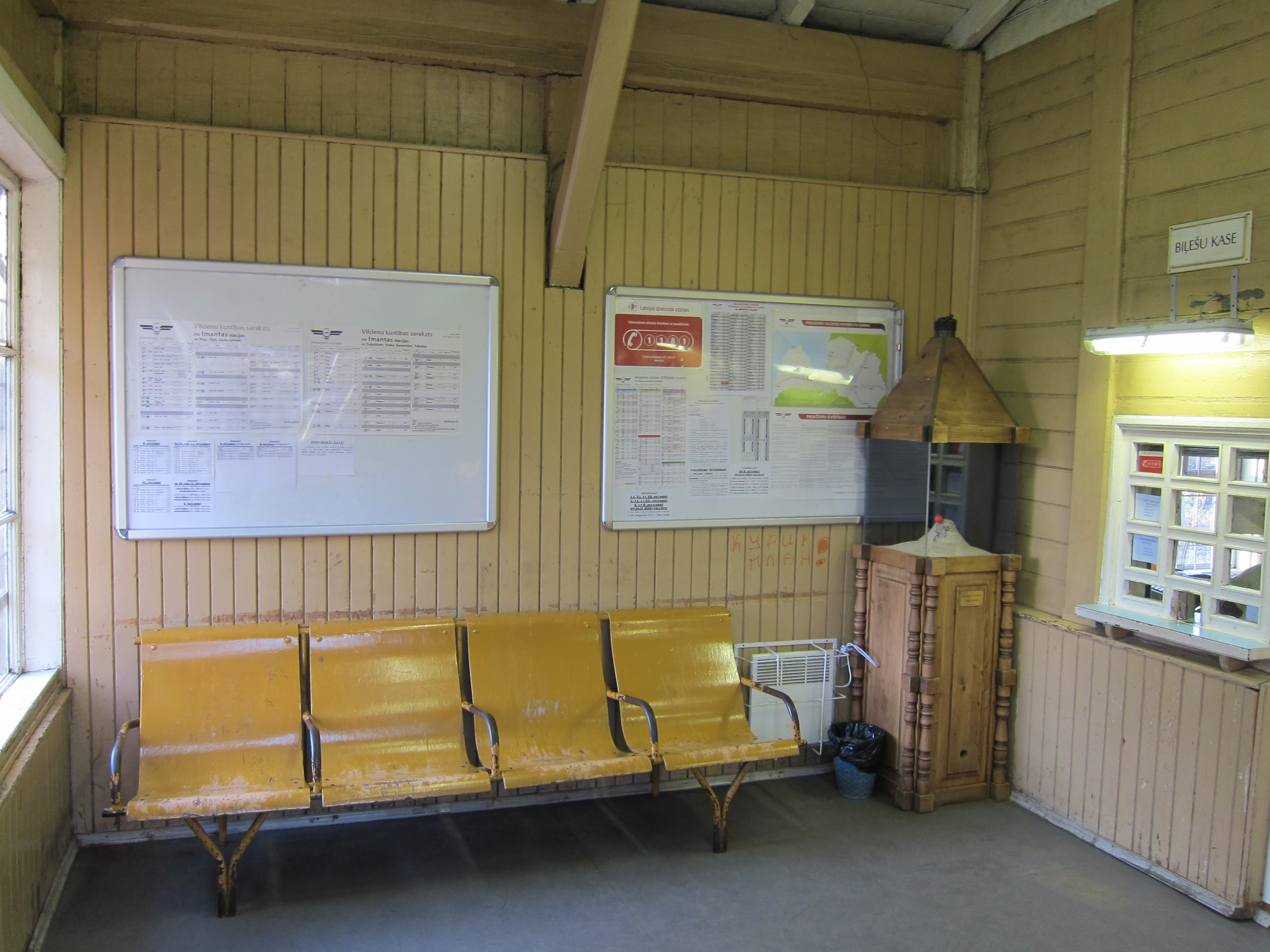
The old interior

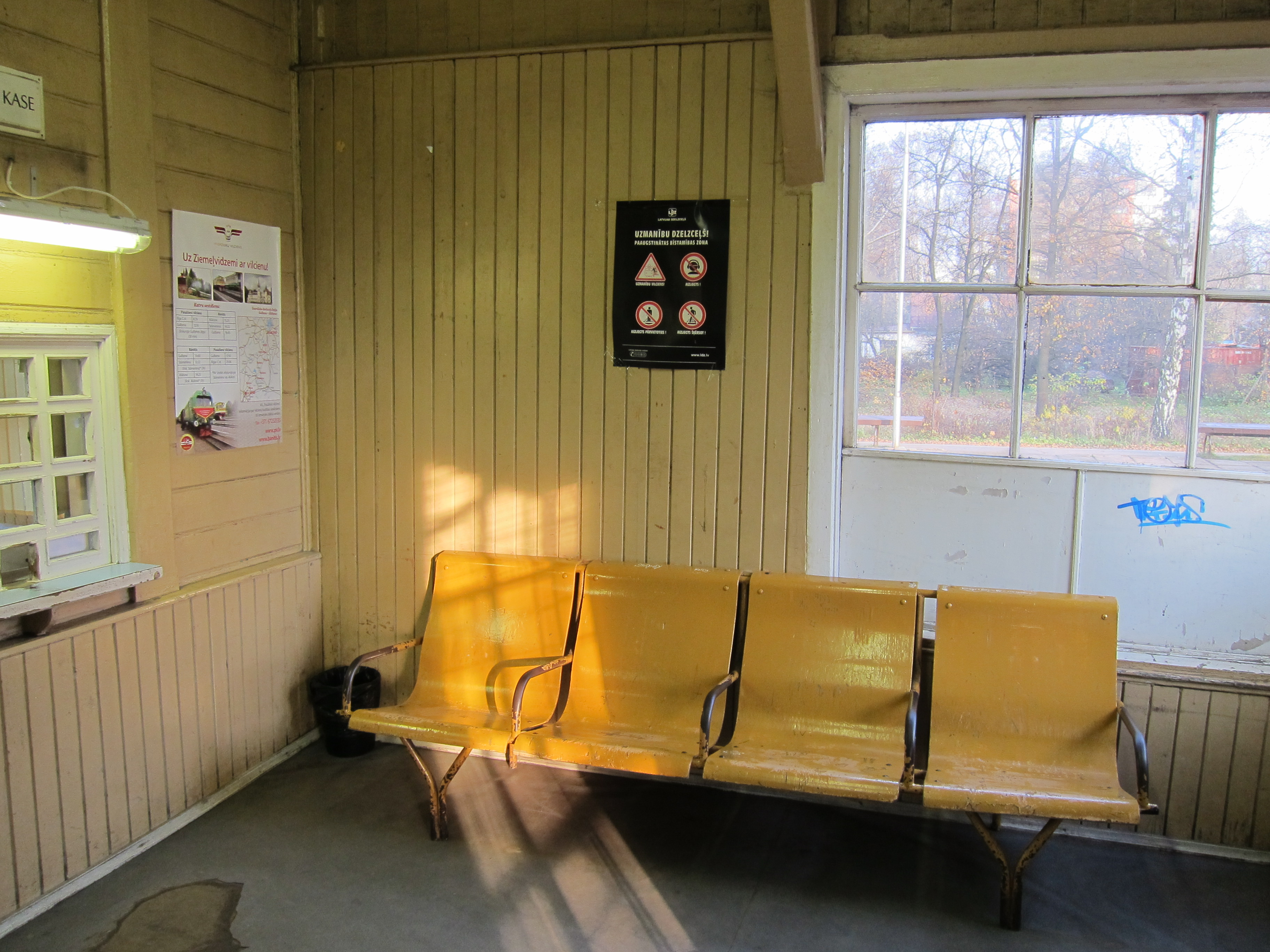
The old interior

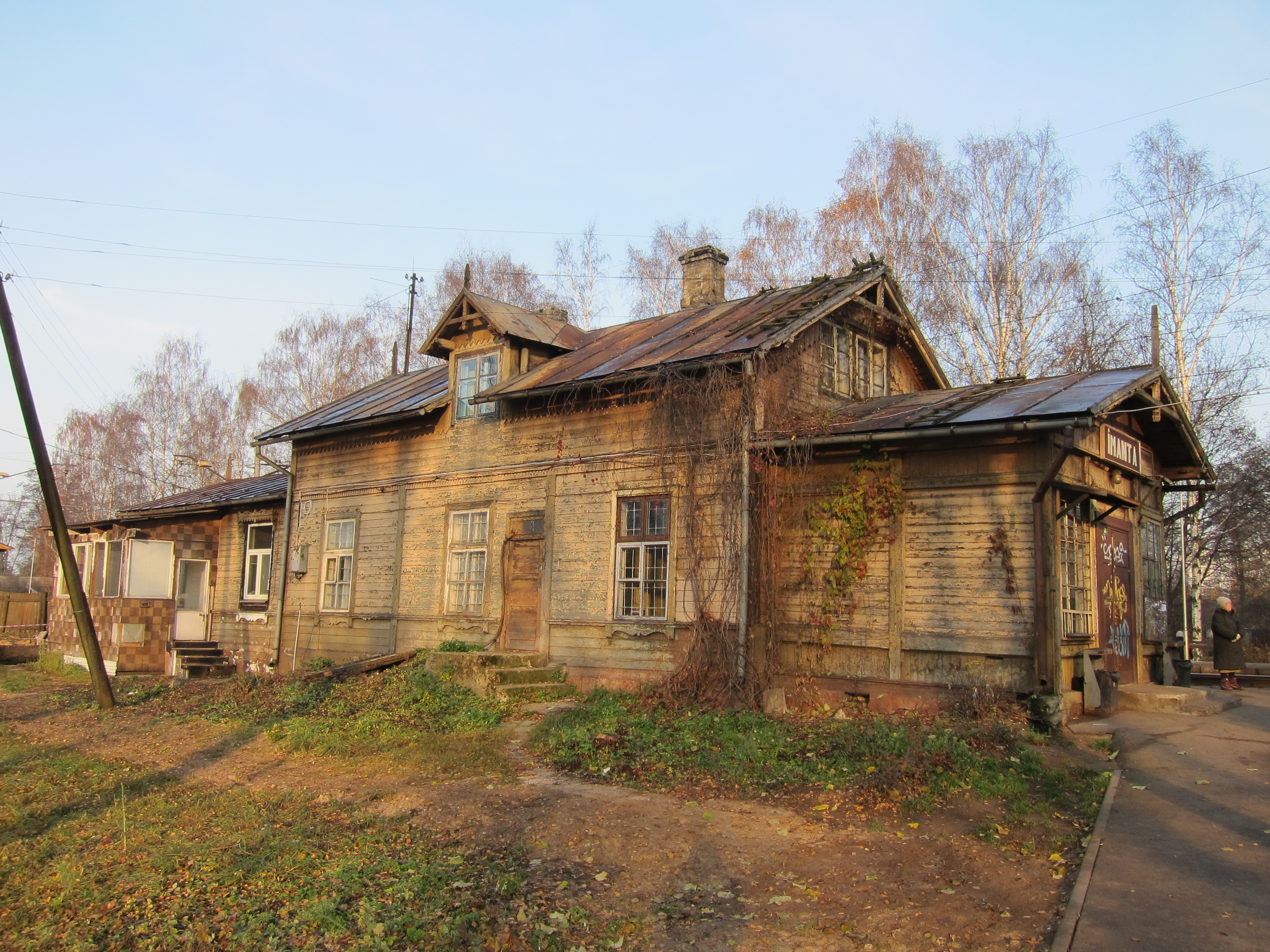
View from the city

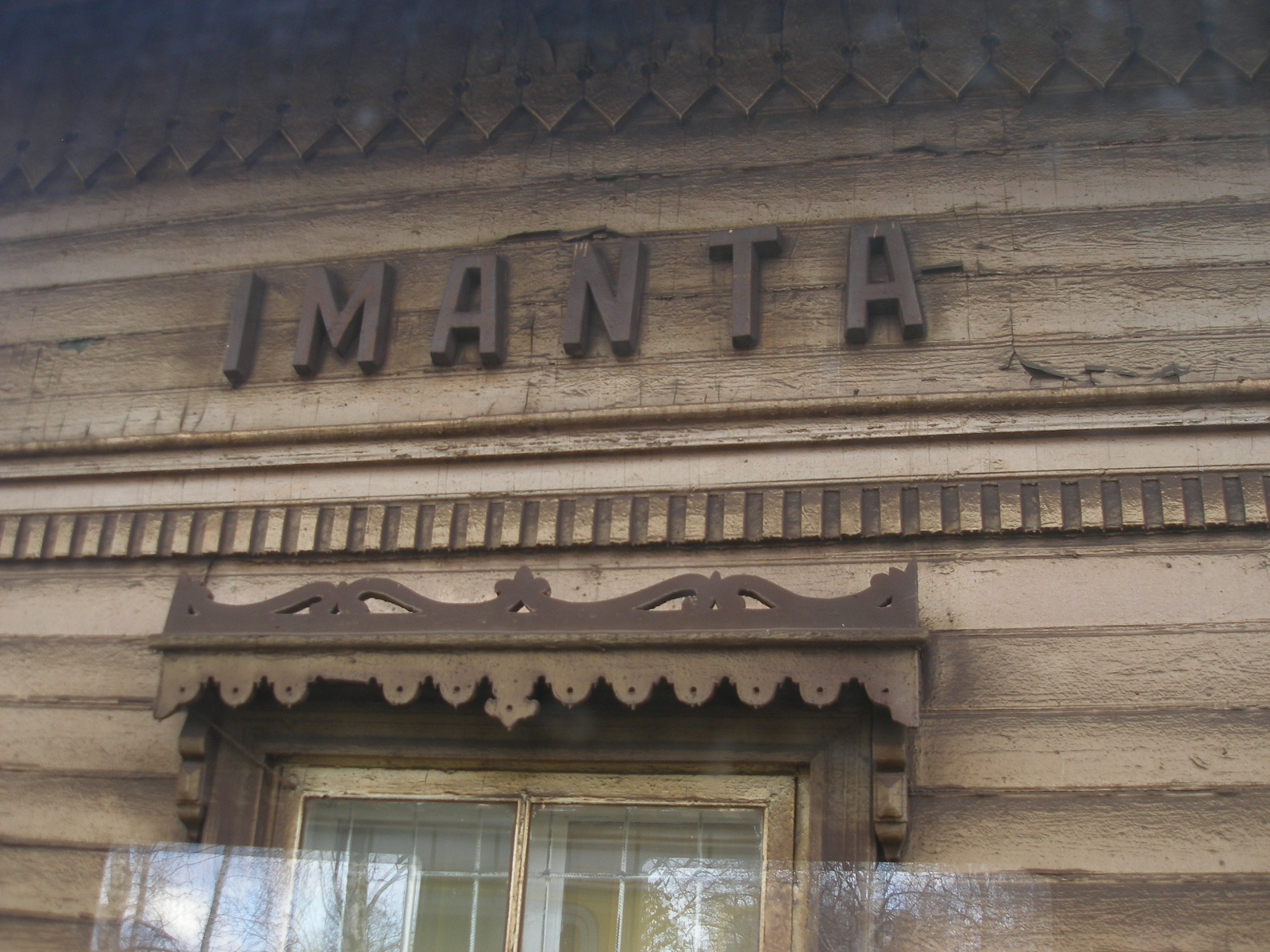
Old name plaque

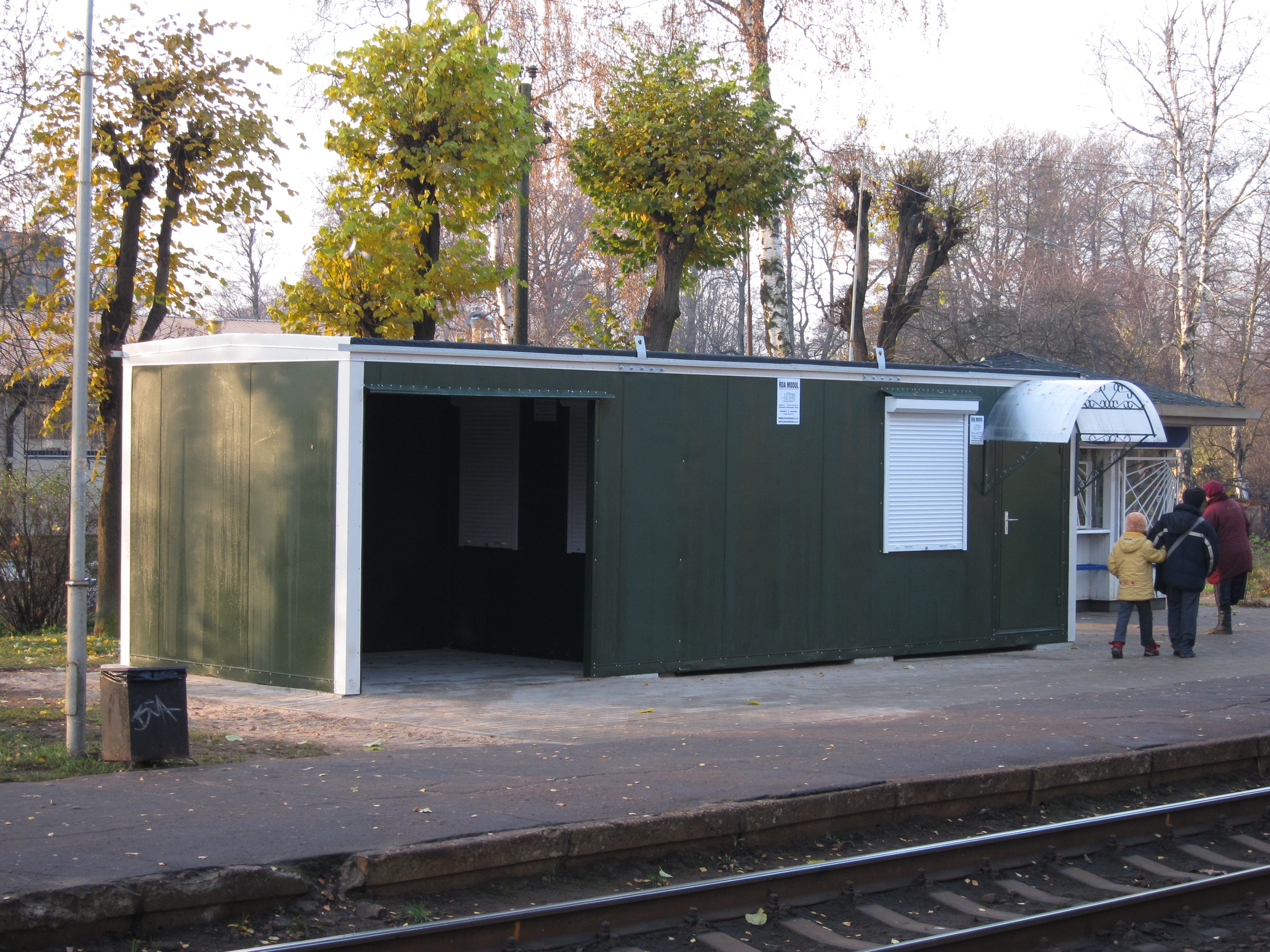
Temporary ticket booth and shelter in 2011

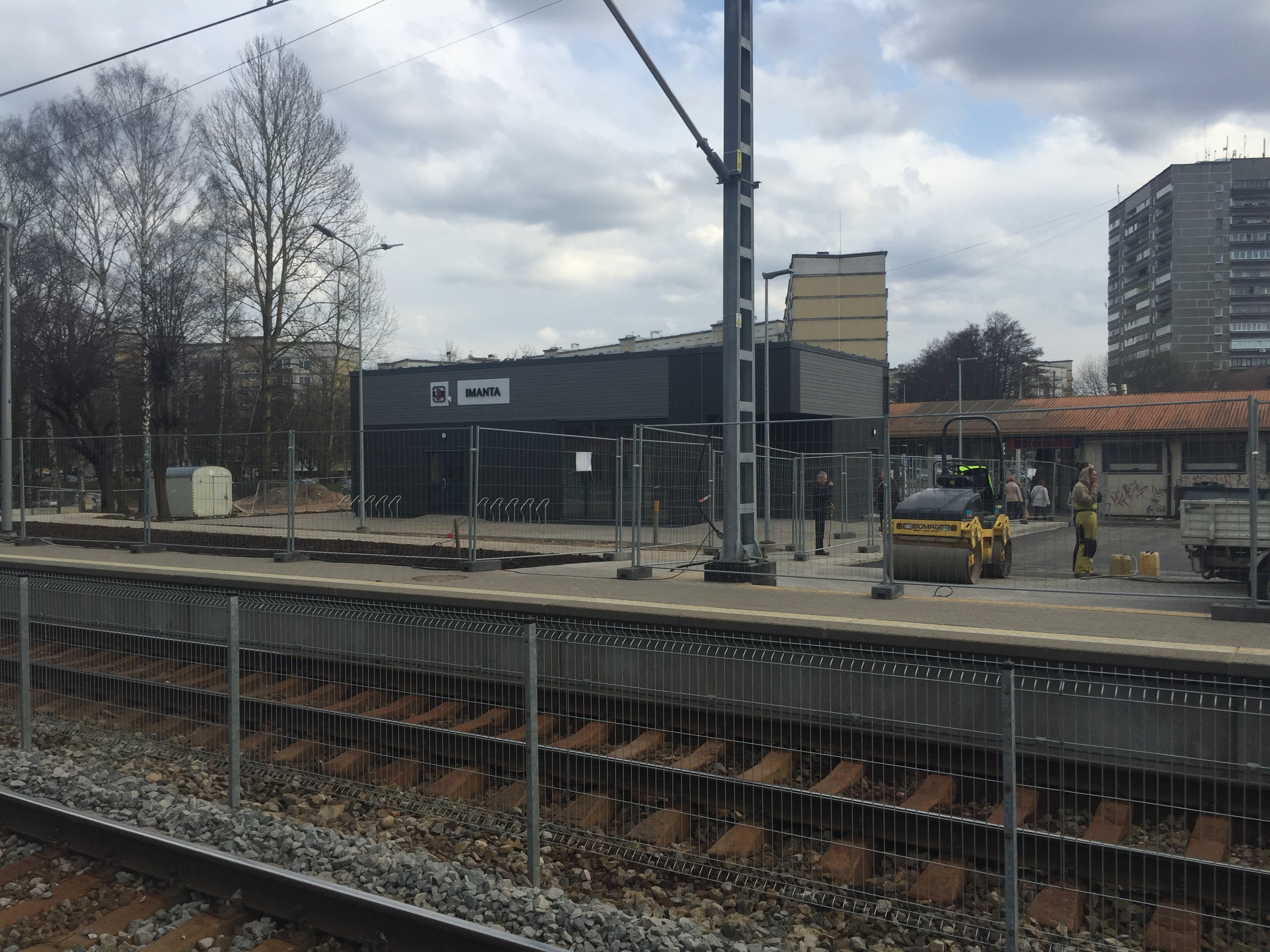
The new building in 2016
