= Priedaine Station =

Railway station in Jūrmala, Latvia

Priedaine
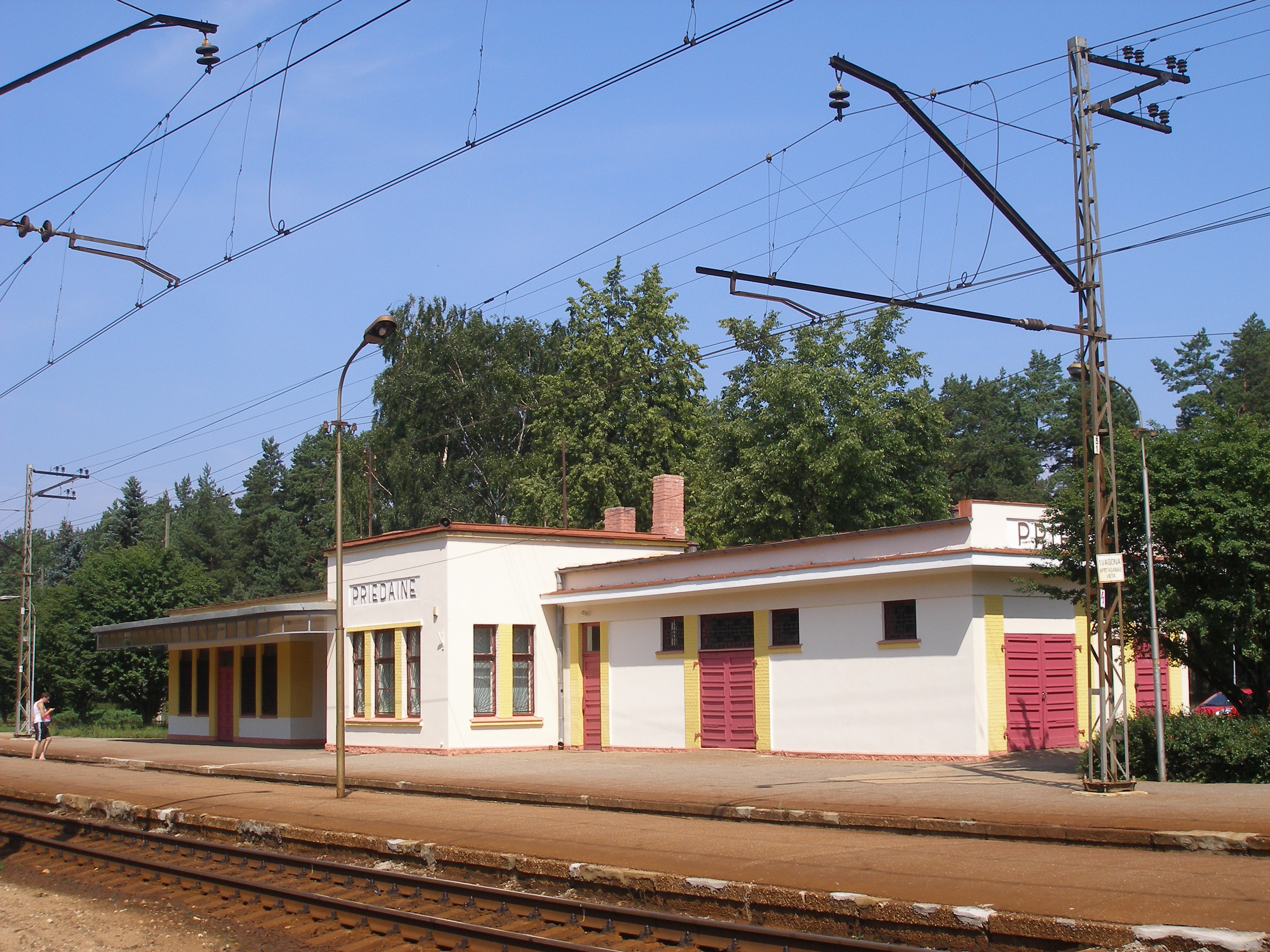

General information
- Location: Lielais prospekts 2b Priedaine, Jūrmala; Latvia
- Coordinates: 56°58′17.66″N 23°53′13.27″E
- Platforms: 3
- Tracks: 3

History
- Opened: 1909
- Rebuilt: 1938
- Former names: Sosnovij

Services
Preceding station	LDz	Following station
Lielupe towards Tukums II	Torņakalns–Tukums II Railway	Babīte towards Riga
Location

Priedaine Station is a railway station serving the Priedaine neighbourhood of Jūrmala, Latvia. The station is located on the Torņakalns–Tukums II Railway.
