= Dzirciems =

Neighbourhood of Riga, Latvia

Coordinates: 56.9578°N 24.0628°E

- Neighborhood of Riga
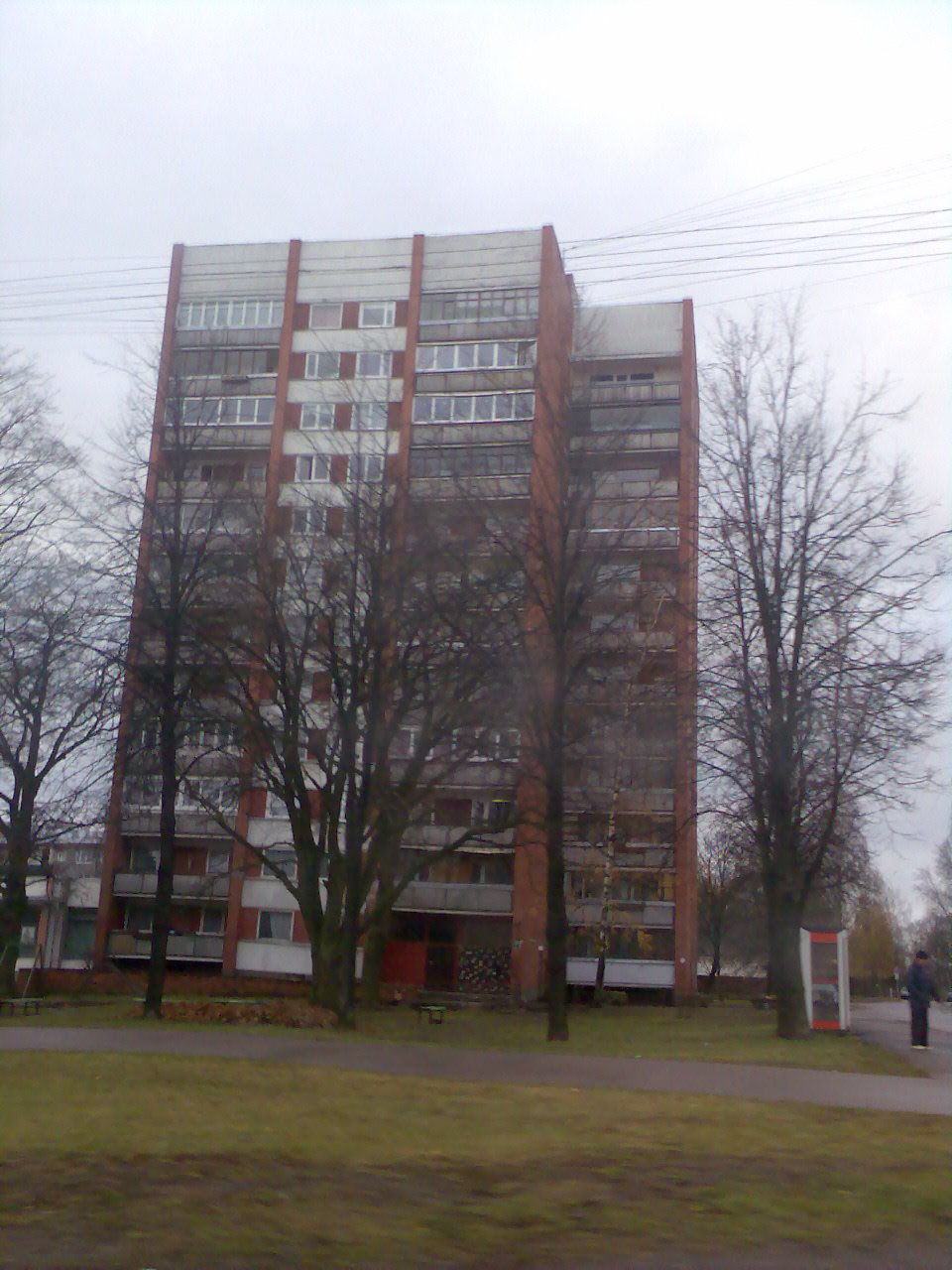
- 12 floor highrise in Dzirciems on Dzirciema street

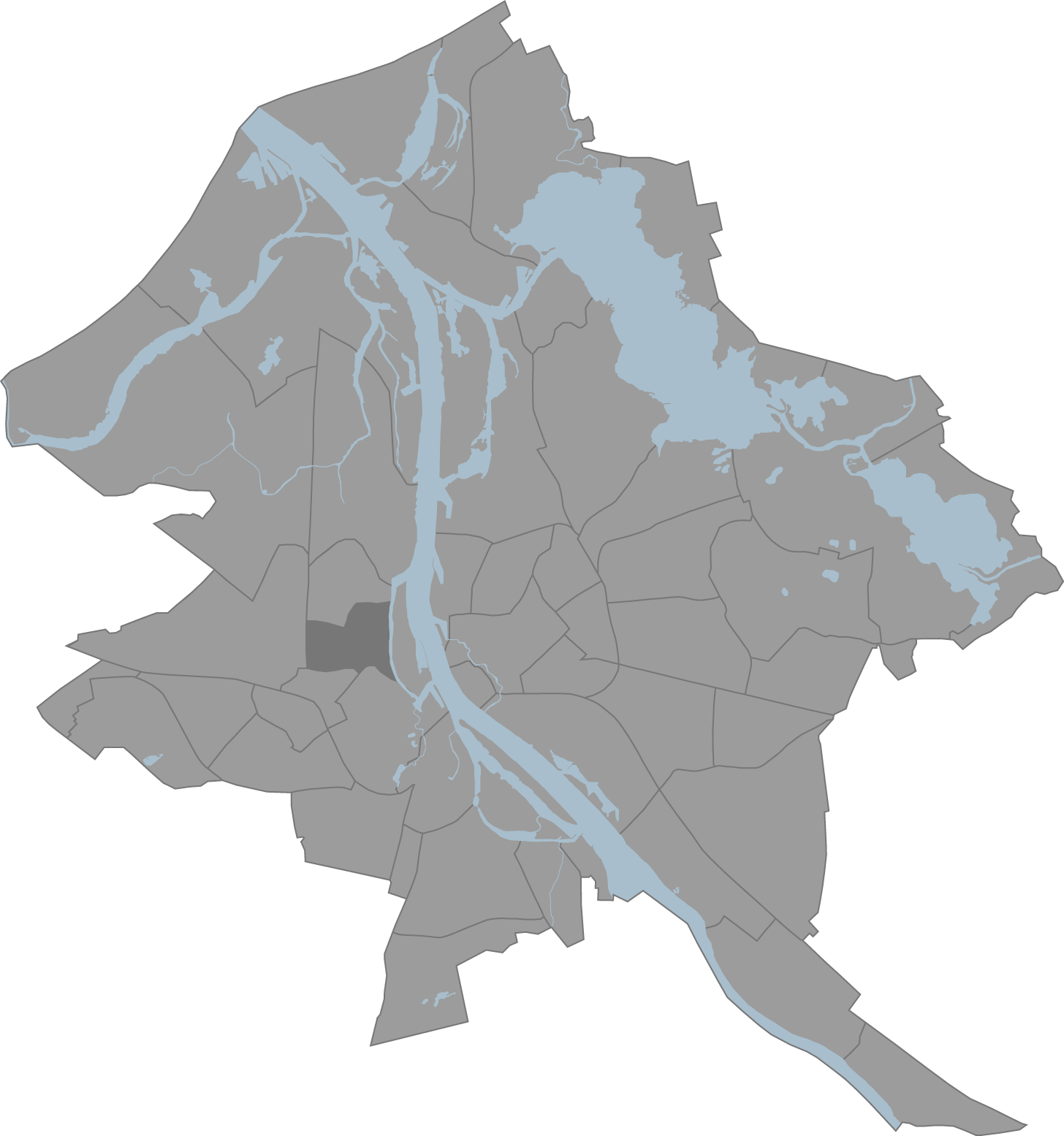
- Location in Riga
- Country: Latvia
- City: Riga
- District: Kurzemes rajons

Area
  - Total: 2.44 km^{2} (0.94 sq mi)

Population (2024)
  - Total: 10,501
  - Density: 4,300/km^{2} (11,100/sq mi)
- Time zone: UTC+2 (EET)
  - Summer (DST): UTC+3 (EEST)

Dzirciems is a Riga neighbourhood located in the Pārdaugava side of Riga. It mainly consists of Soviet-style apartment buildings built in the 1970s. Riga Stradiņš University is located here.

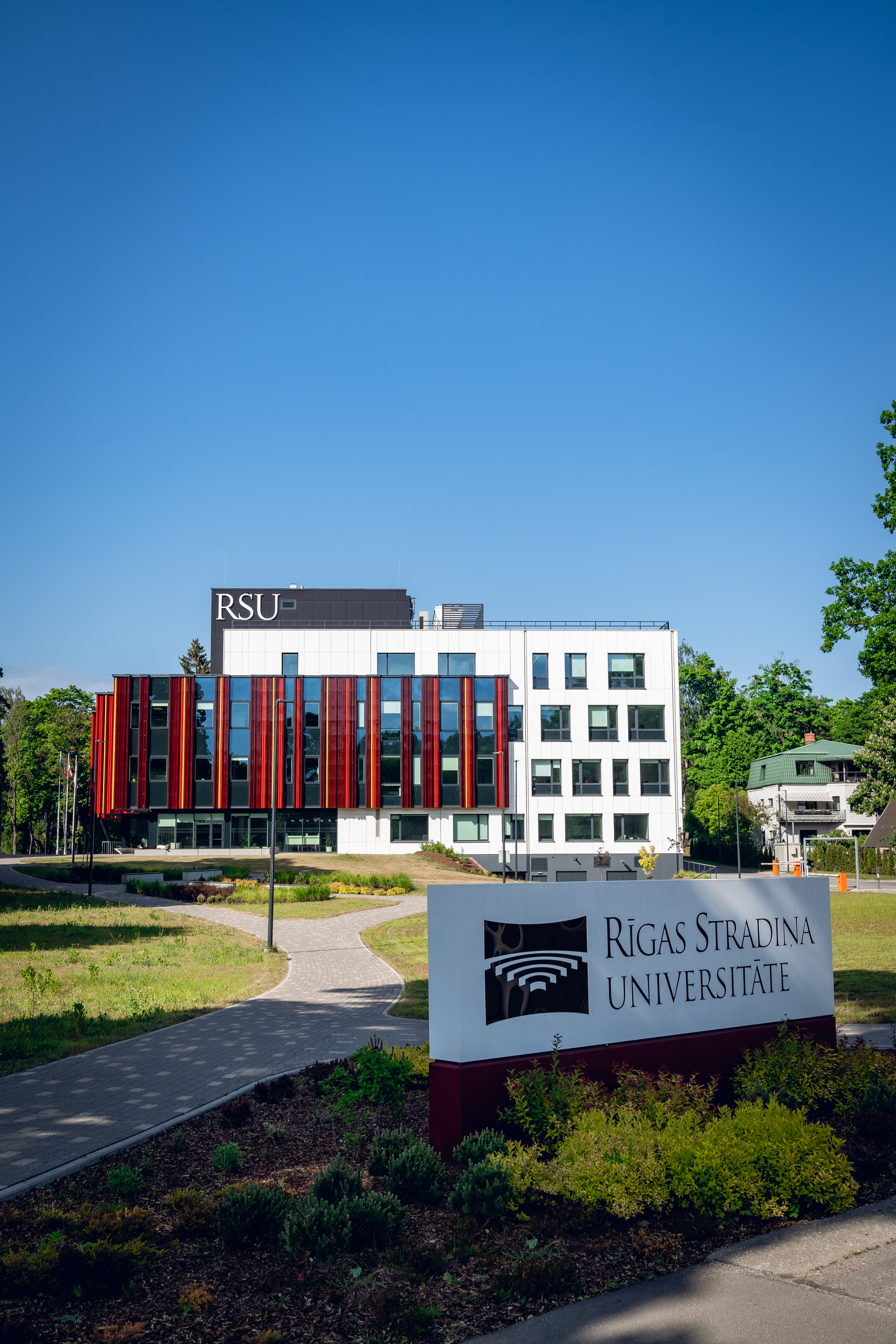
The main building of Riga Stradiņš University
