= Kleisti =

Neighbourhood of Riga, Latvia

Coordinates: 56°59′42″N 24°00′37″E

- Neighbourhood of Riga
- Kleisti
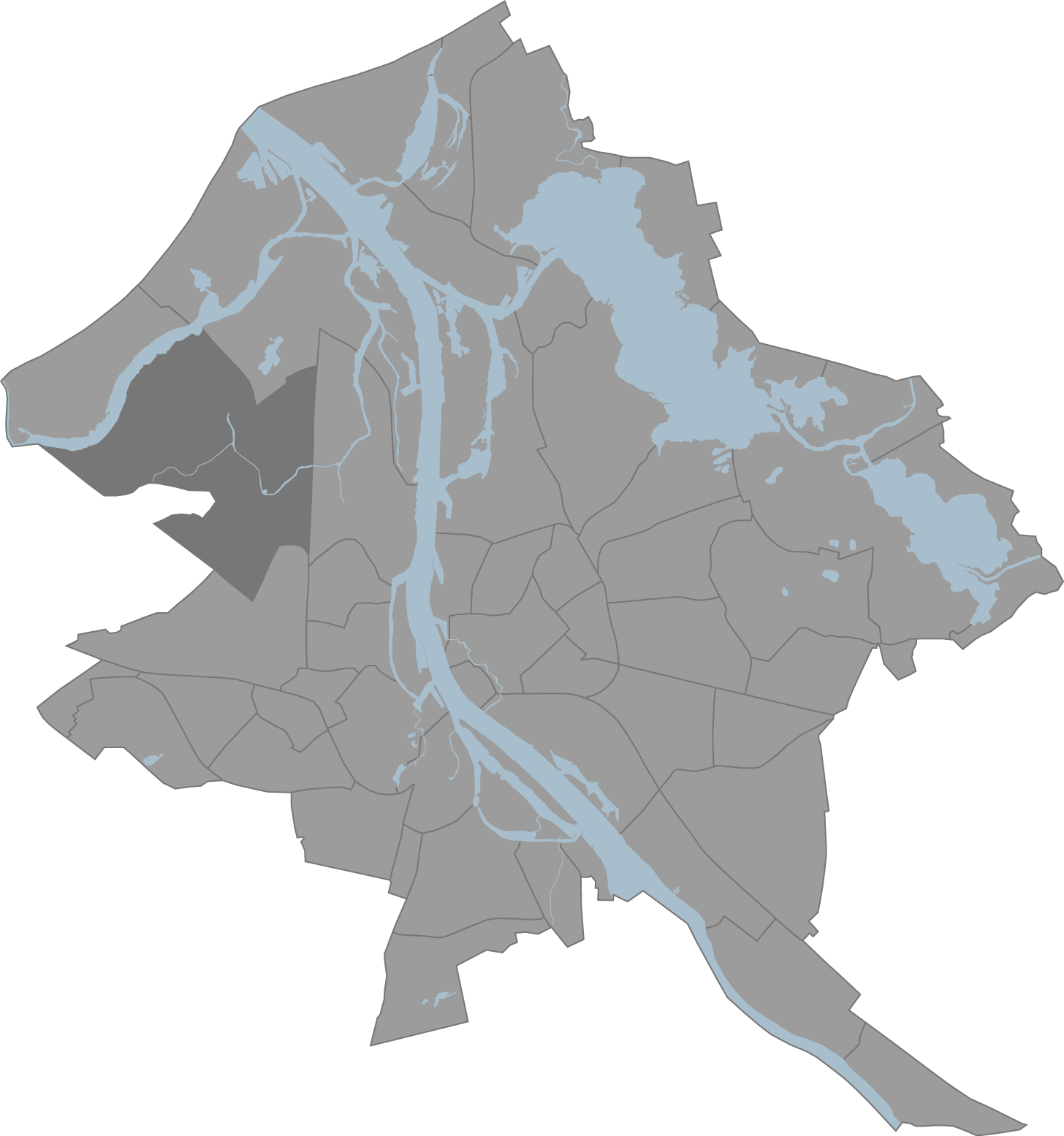
- Location of Kleisti in Riga
- Country: Latvia
- City: Riga
- District: Kurzeme District

Area
  - Total: 18.730 km^{2} (7.232 sq mi)

Population (2018)
  - Total: 269
  - Density: 14.4/km^{2} (37.2/sq mi)
- Website: apkaimes.lv

Kleisti is a neighbourhood of Riga, the capital of Latvia. It is the largest neighbourhood of Riga by area, although sparsely populated. Most of the neighbourhood is woods and overgrown meadows.

The name of the neighbourhood comes from the former Kleisti Manor (Kleiste).
