= Babīte Station =

Railway station in Latvia

Babīte
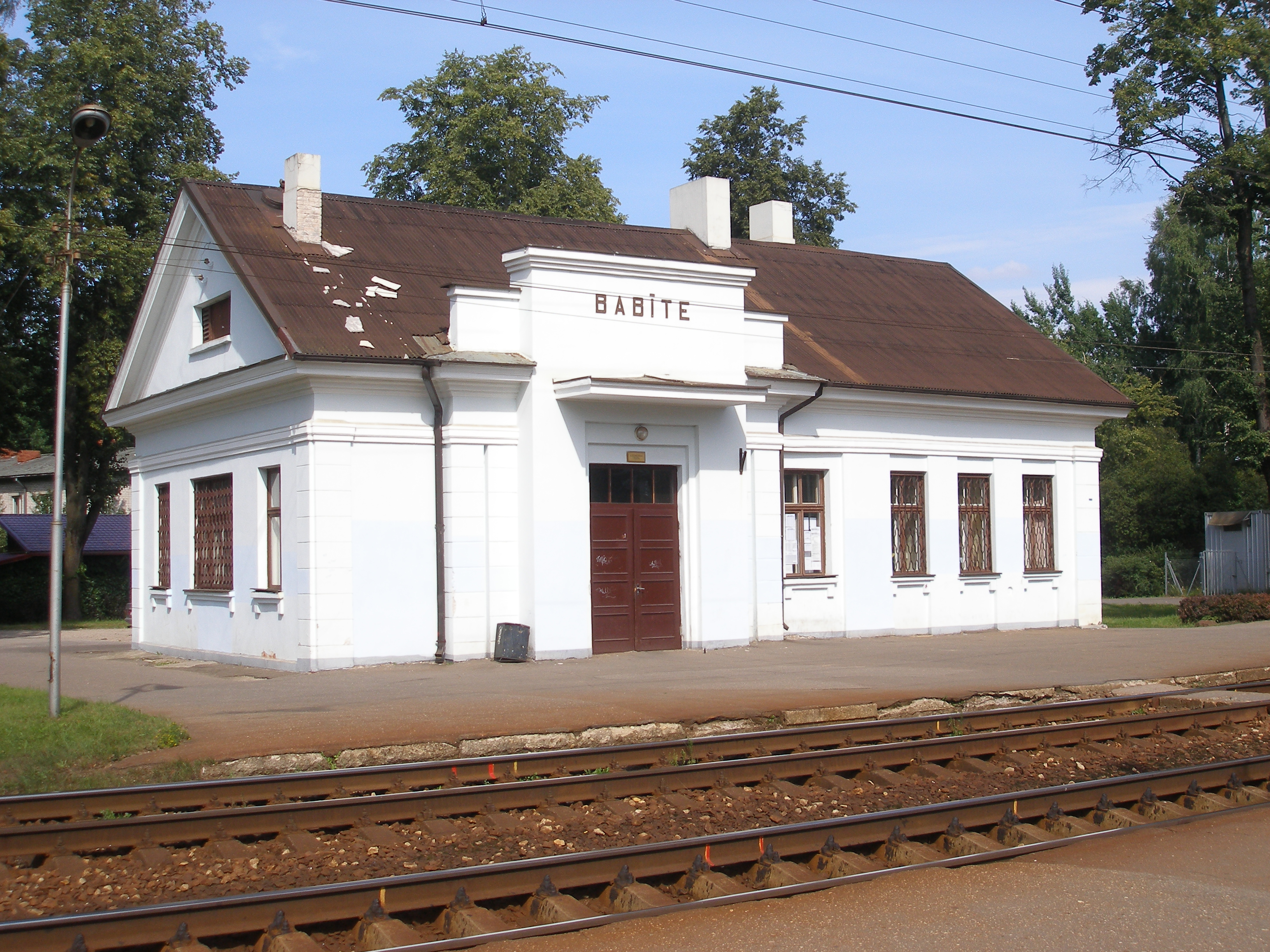
- Station building in 2011

General information
- Location: Babītes stacijas, Babīte; Babīte Parish, Mārupe Municipality; Latvia
- Coordinates: 56°57′26.20″N 23°57′10.19″E
- Platforms: 2
- Tracks: 2

History
- Opened: 1877
- Rebuilt: 1950

Services
Preceding station	LDz	Following station
Priedaine towards Tukums II	Torņakalns–Tukums II Railway	Imanta towards Riga
Location

Babīte Station is a railway station serving the village of Babīte west of Riga, Latvia. It is located on the Torņakalns–Tukums II Railway.
