= Priedaine =

Neighborhood of Jurmala, Latvia

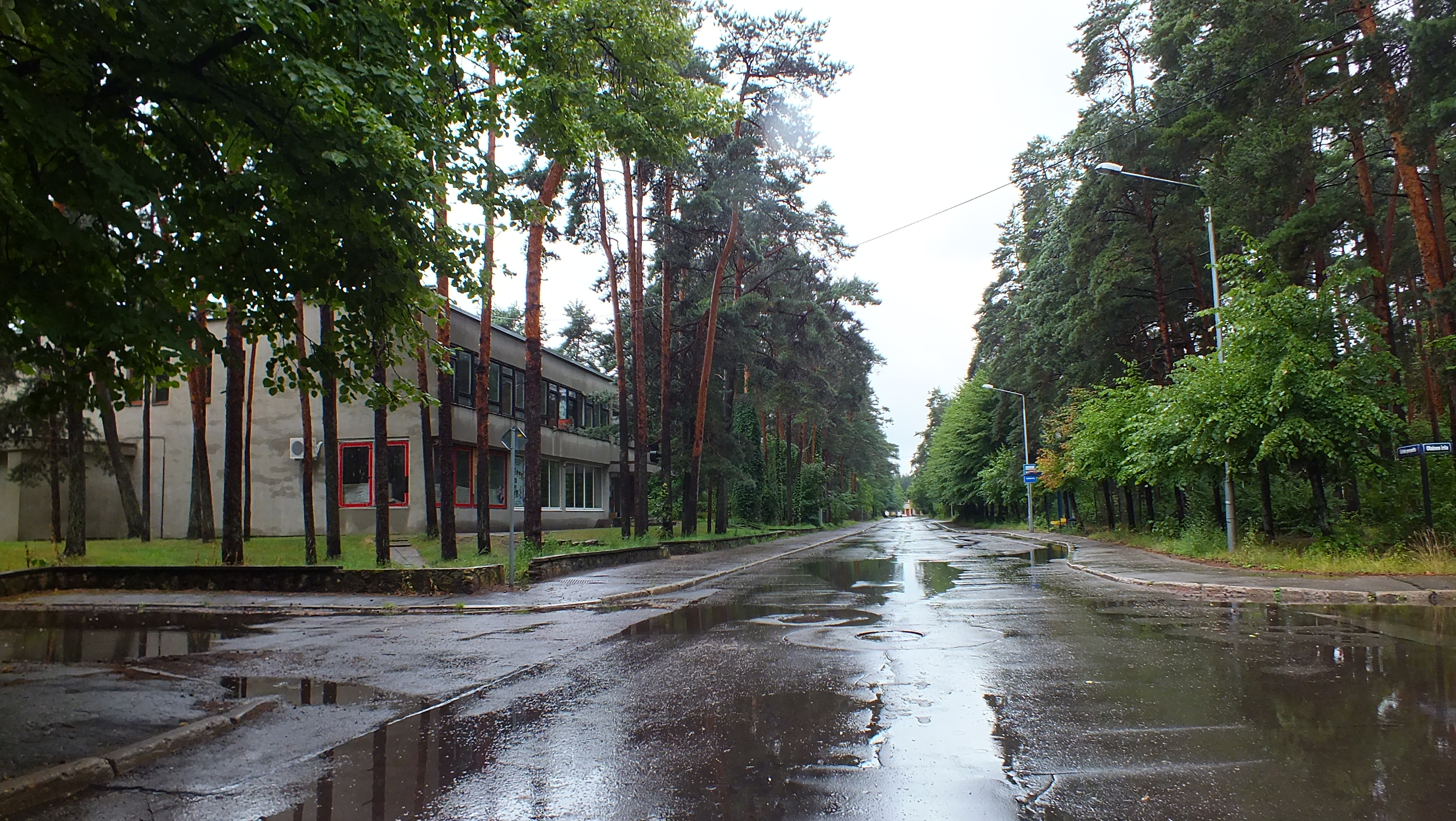
- Grand Avenue in Priedaine

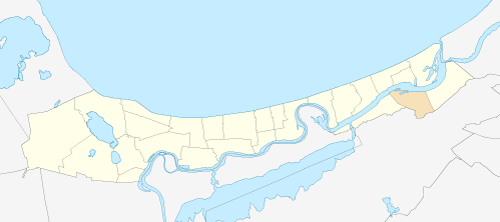
- Location in Jūrmala
- Coordinates: 56°58′27″N 23°53′42″E
- Country: Latvia
- City: Jūrmala
- Village from: 1935
- Added to Riga: 1949

Area
  - Total: 3.8 km^{2} (1.5 sq mi)
- Elevation: 5 m (16 ft)

Population (2008)
  - Total: 699
  - Density: 183.9/km^{2} (476/sq mi)

Priedaine is a residential area and neighbourhood of the city Jūrmala, Latvia.

The Priedaine railway station was established in 1909.

== History ==
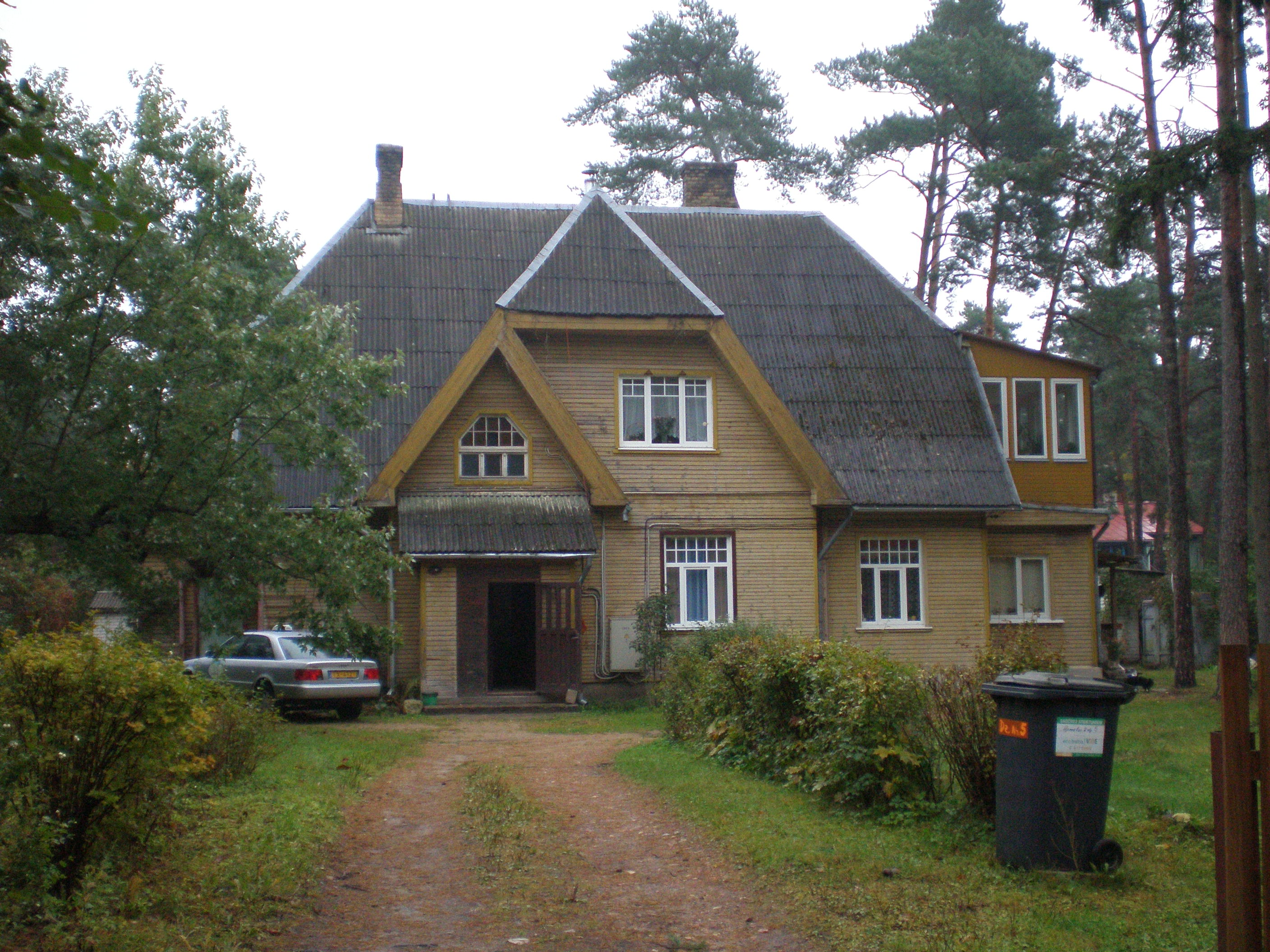
House in Priedaine built in early 20 century.

Two Stone Age settlements have been found in Priedaine (in Vārnukrogs and Priedaine forest), thus this is the oldest settlement in Jūrmala.

In the 19th century, the German congregation of the Old Gertrude Church opened the first known boarding house in this location. Priedaine (German: Kiefernhalt) was established here in the late 19th century. As early as 1911, more than 100 houses were built; the buildings mostly consisted of private houses and summer homes. In 1935, Priedaine in Salas Parish was granted the status of a densely populated area (village). On April 7, 1949, Priedaine was included in the then existing Jurmala district of Riga. In Soviet times, a peat processing plant and a factory for reinforced concrete structures, were established here. A school and a local culture house were also built during this time.
