= Voleri =

Neighborhood of Riga, Latvia

Coordinates: 57.0131°N 24.0803°E

- Neighbourhood of Riga
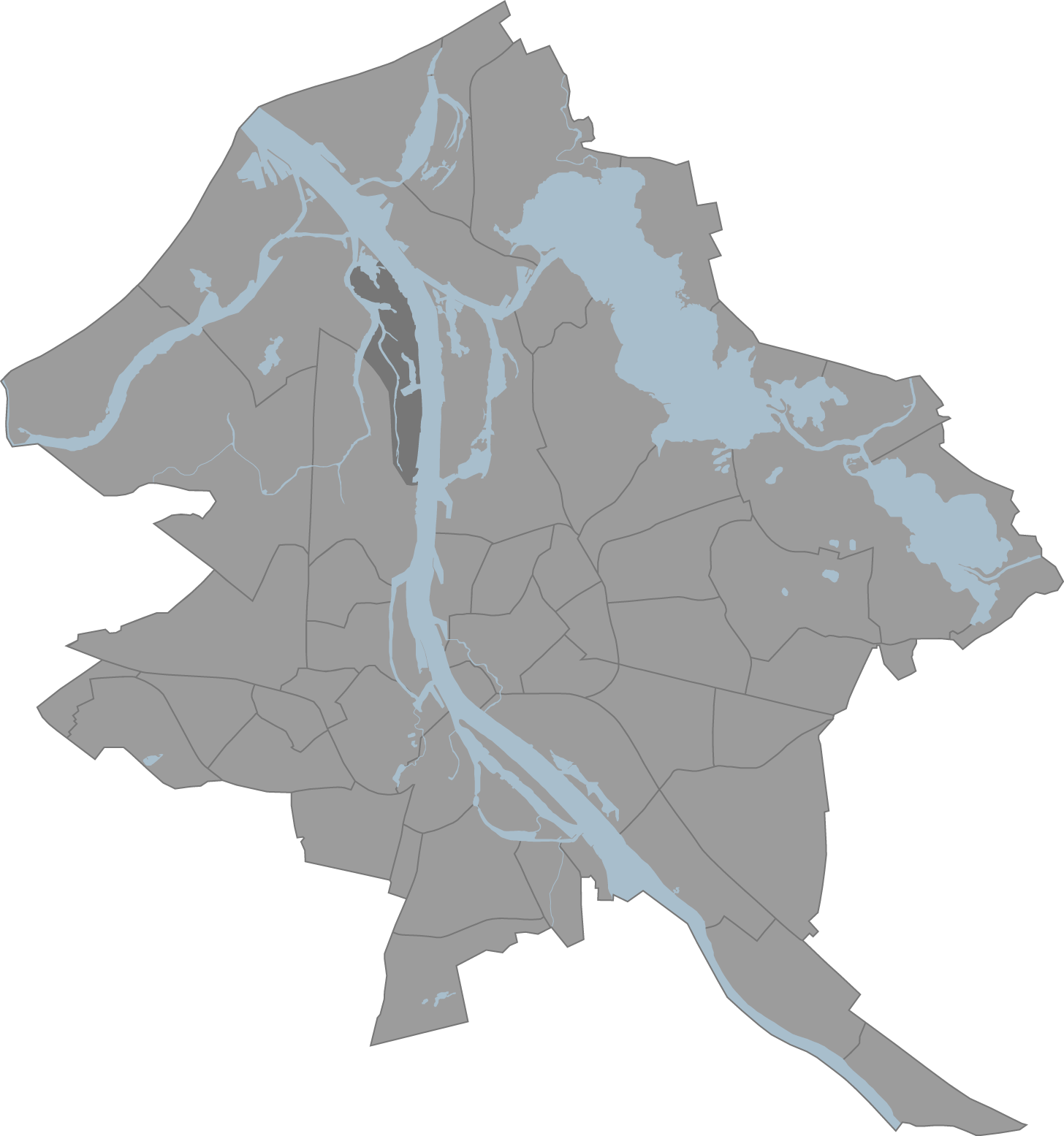
- Location of Voleri in Riga
- Country: Latvia
- City: Riga
- District: Kurzeme District

Area
  - Total: 5.315 km^{2} (2.052 sq mi)

Population (2018)
  - Total: 299
  - Density: 56.3/km^{2} (146/sq mi)
- Website: apkaimes.lv

Voleri is a neighbourhood of Riga, the capital of Latvia.
