= Bolderāja =

Neighborhood of Riga, Latvia

- Neighborhood of Riga
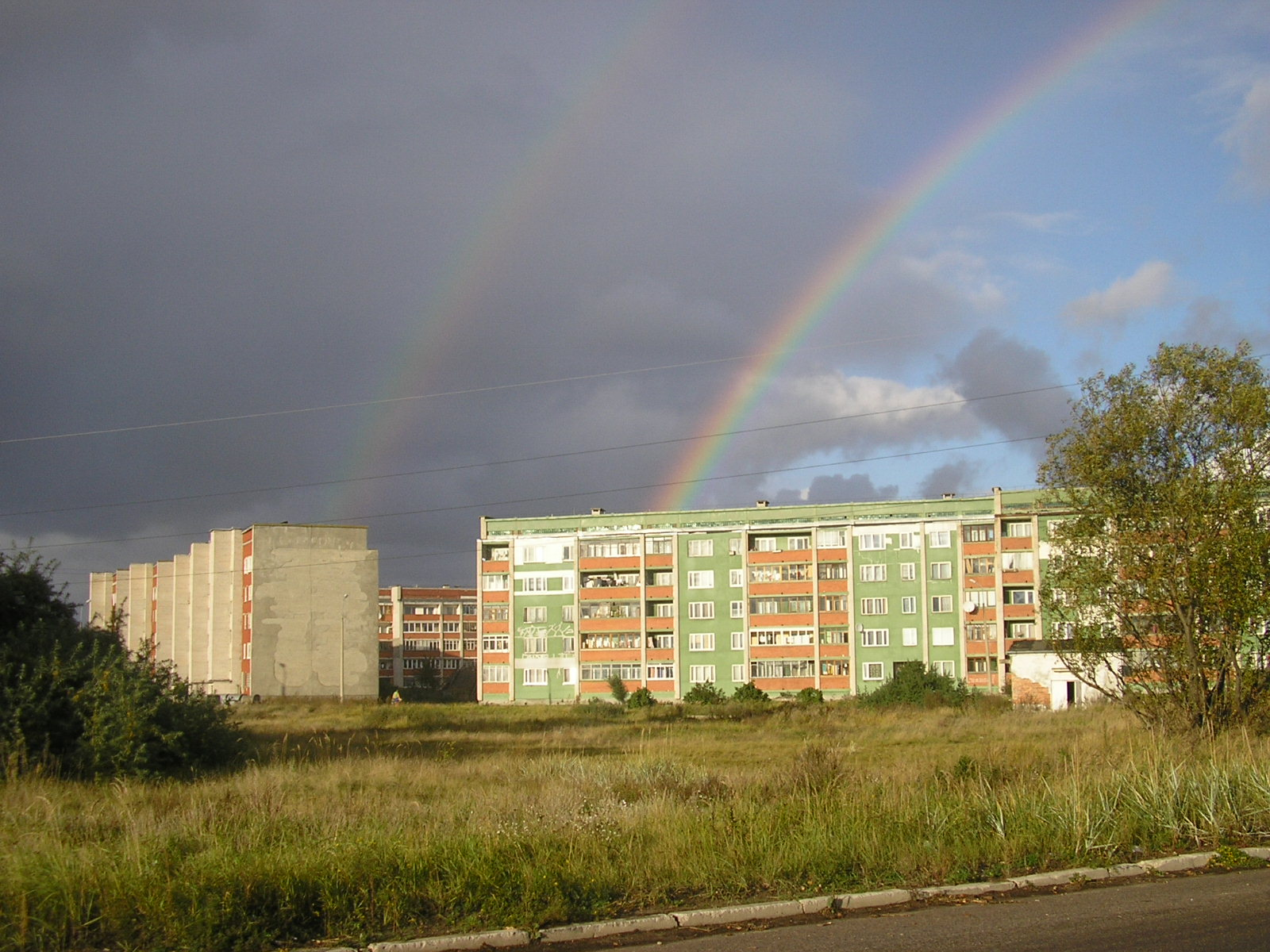
- Rainbow over Bolderāja

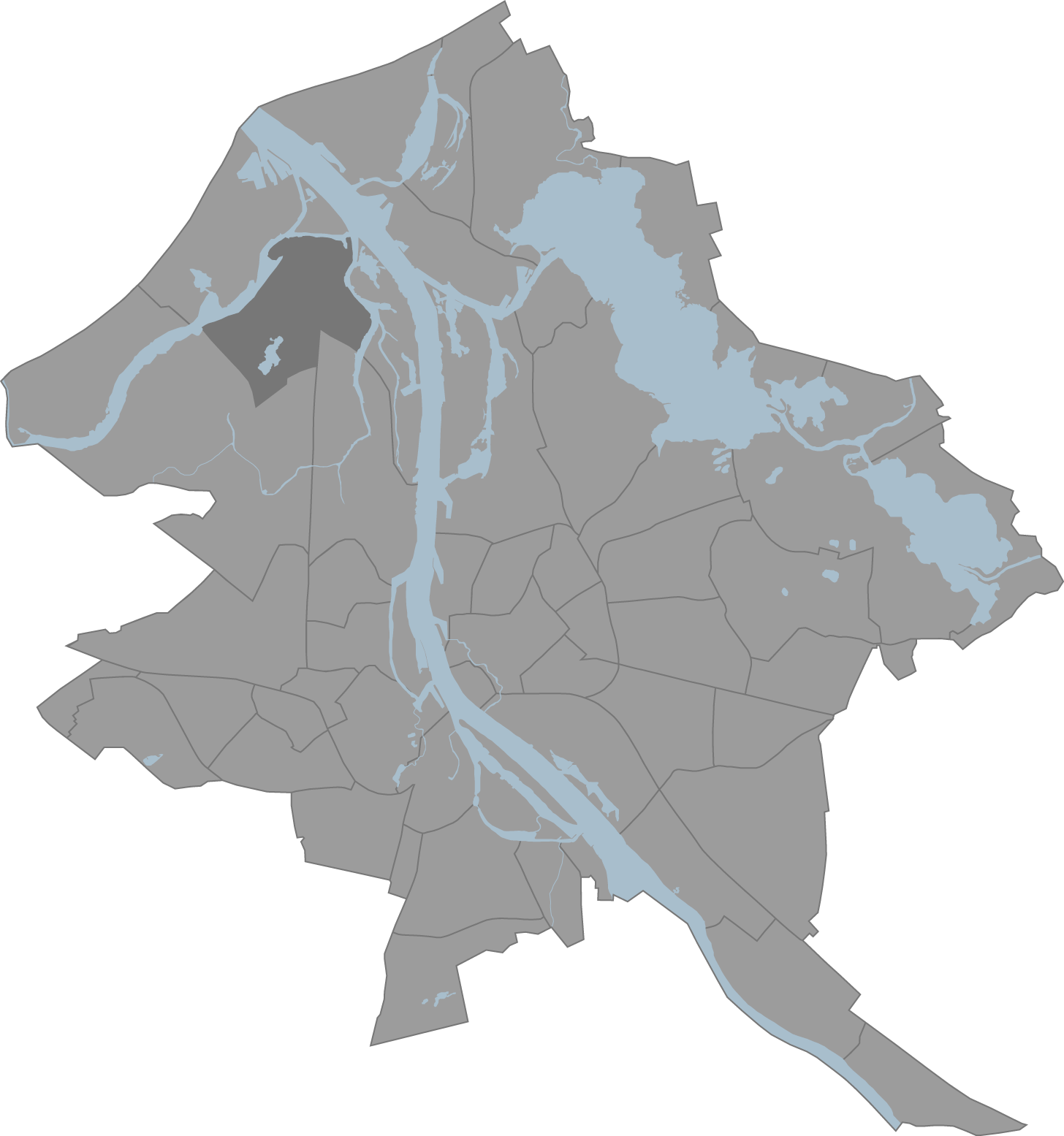
- Location in Riga
- Coordinates: 57°02′N 24°03′E
- Country: Latvia
- City: Riga
- District: Kurzemes rajons

Area
  - Total: 8.329 km^{2} (3.216 sq mi)

Population (2008)
  - Total: 14,771
- Time zone: UTC+2 (EET)
  - Summer (DST): UTC+3 (EEST)

Bolderāja is a neighbourhood of Riga, the capital of Latvia. It is located on the left bank of the Daugava River, in Kurzeme District. Bolderāja probably began as a fishing village. The area has been inhabited since at least the 10th century and possibly for a longer period, however there is no firm evidence because of variations in the course of the Daugava River and the shifting of sand dunes.

The area was made into a Polish customs post in 1606. The wooden houses built during the Polish era in 1603 may be the oldest in Riga.

Bolderāja was the last district added to the city of Riga in 1924.

Bolderāja was a district consisting mostly of private houses and low rise buildings, but after the 1970s five to nine floor blocks of flats were built by the Soviet government. The population of Bolderāja is largely Russian-speaking.

From time immemorial the inhabitants of the area around the mouth of the Daugava river were renowned for being hard-working and courageous. River mouths were historically key strategic positions. Consequently, many battles were fought with numerous invaders.

== Geography ==
Bolderāja is located in the northwest part of Riga city, on the left bank of the Daugava River and about 2 km away from the Gulf of Riga.

Bolderāja is surrounded by water. From the south-east, the Hapaka Ditch (Hapaka grāvis), from the east, the Daugava River, from the north, the Loču Canal (Loču kanāls), and from the west, north-west, the Buļļupe ("Bull River").

== Gallery ==
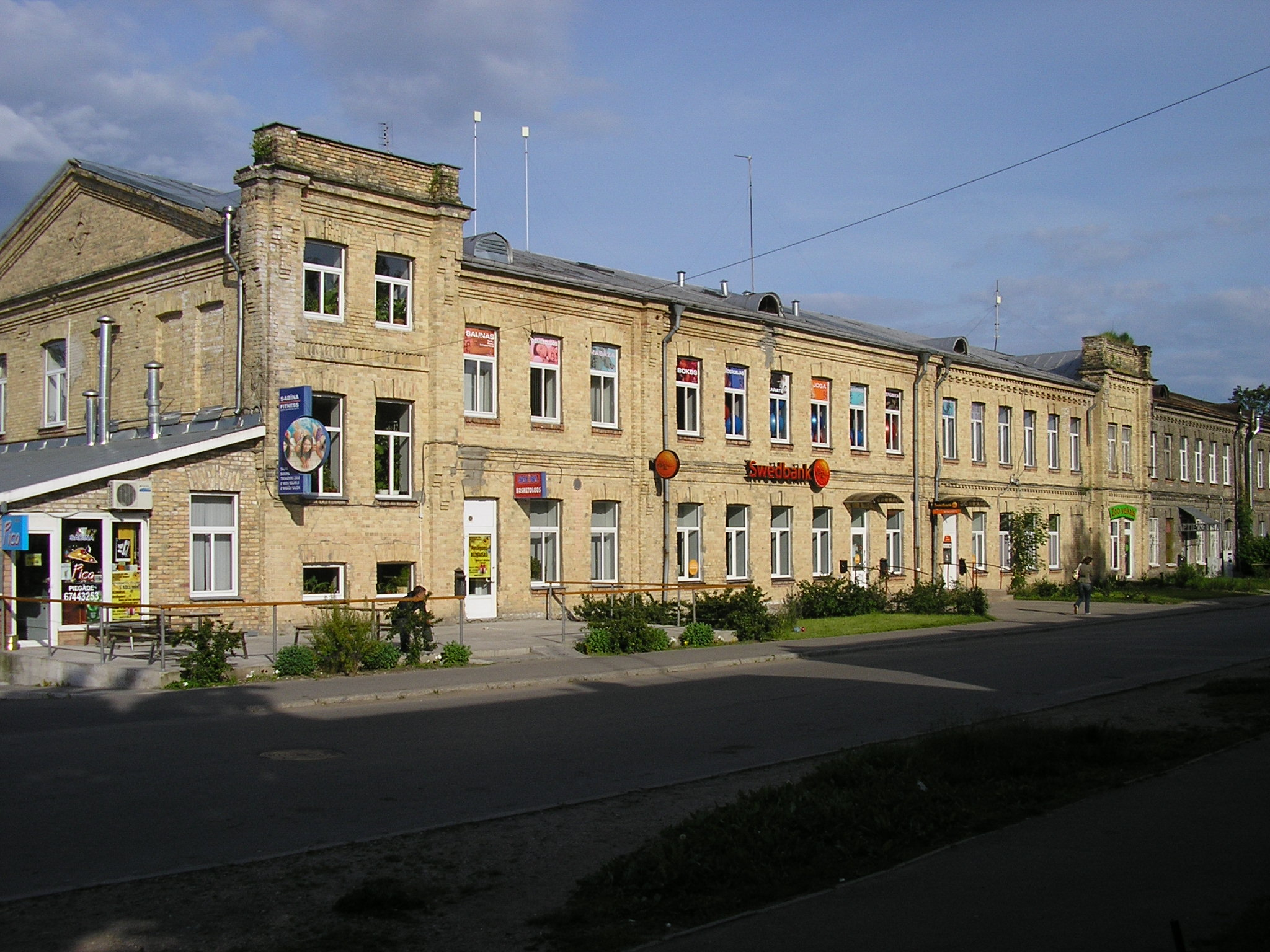
Former military barracks in Bolderāja

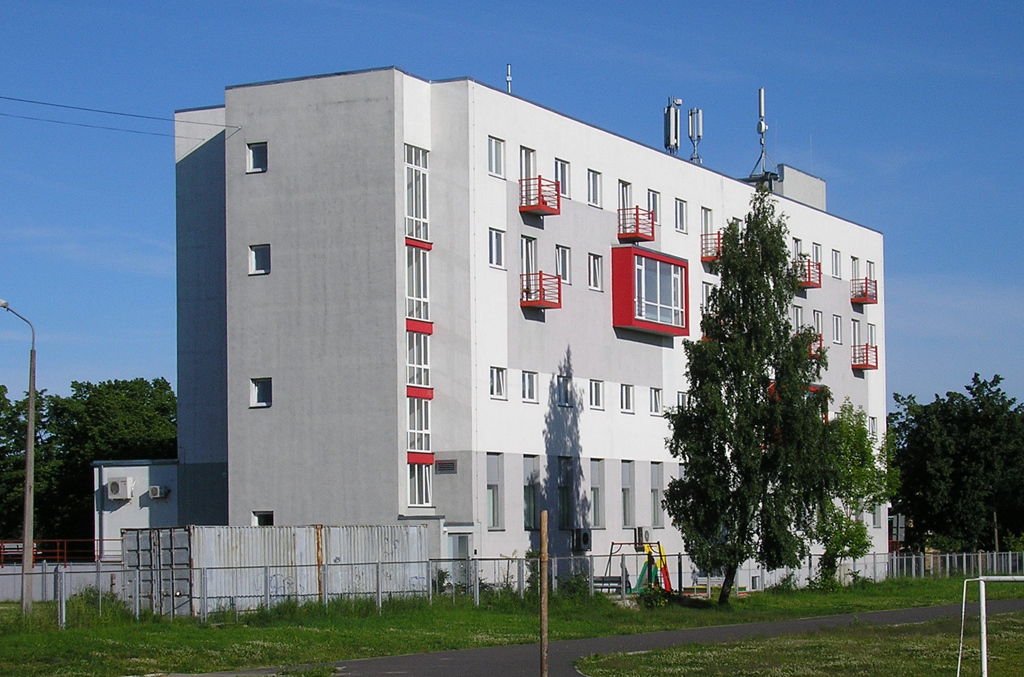
Modern tower block in Bolderāja. Former warehouse.

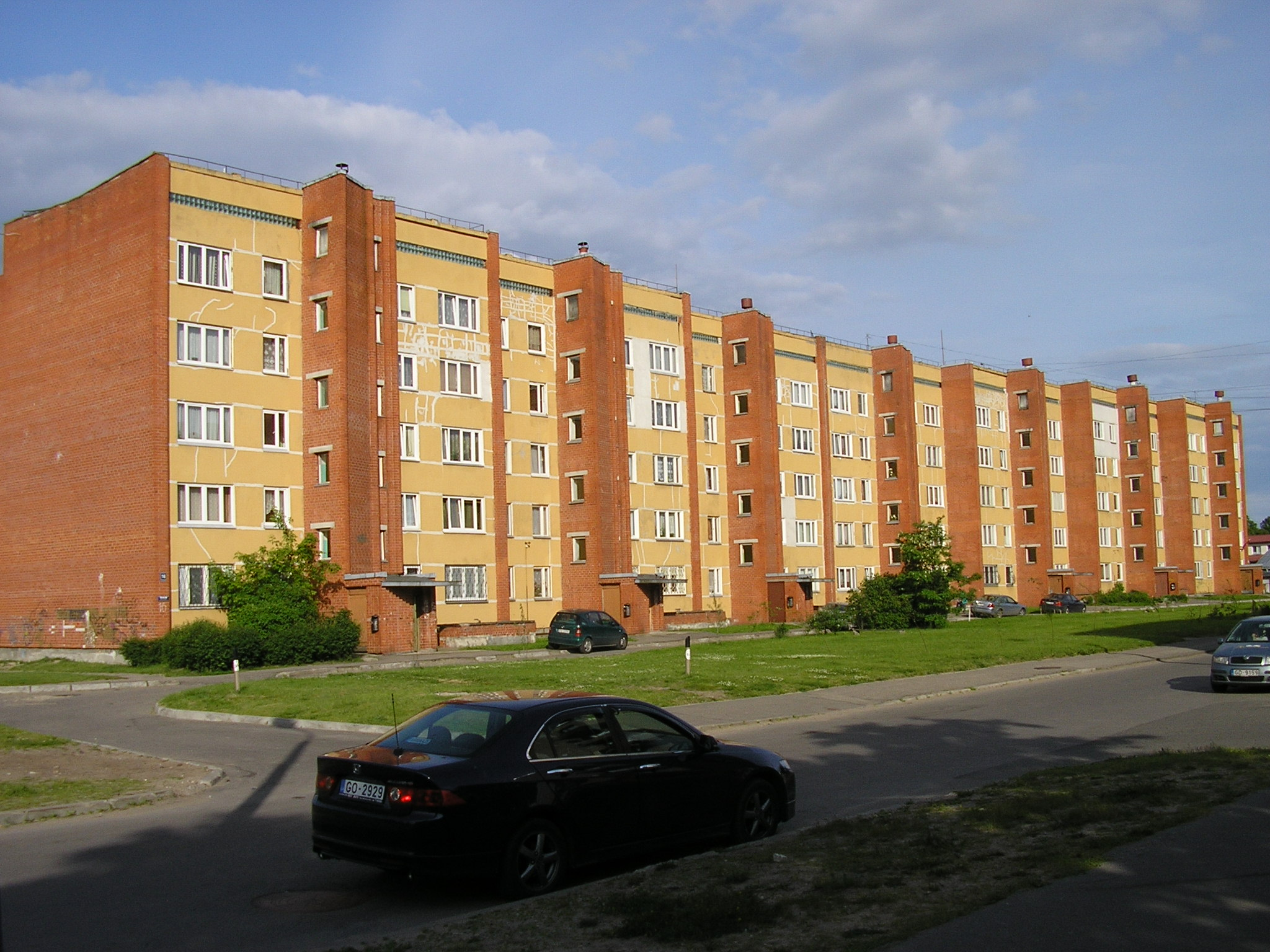
Soviet built tower block in Bolderāja

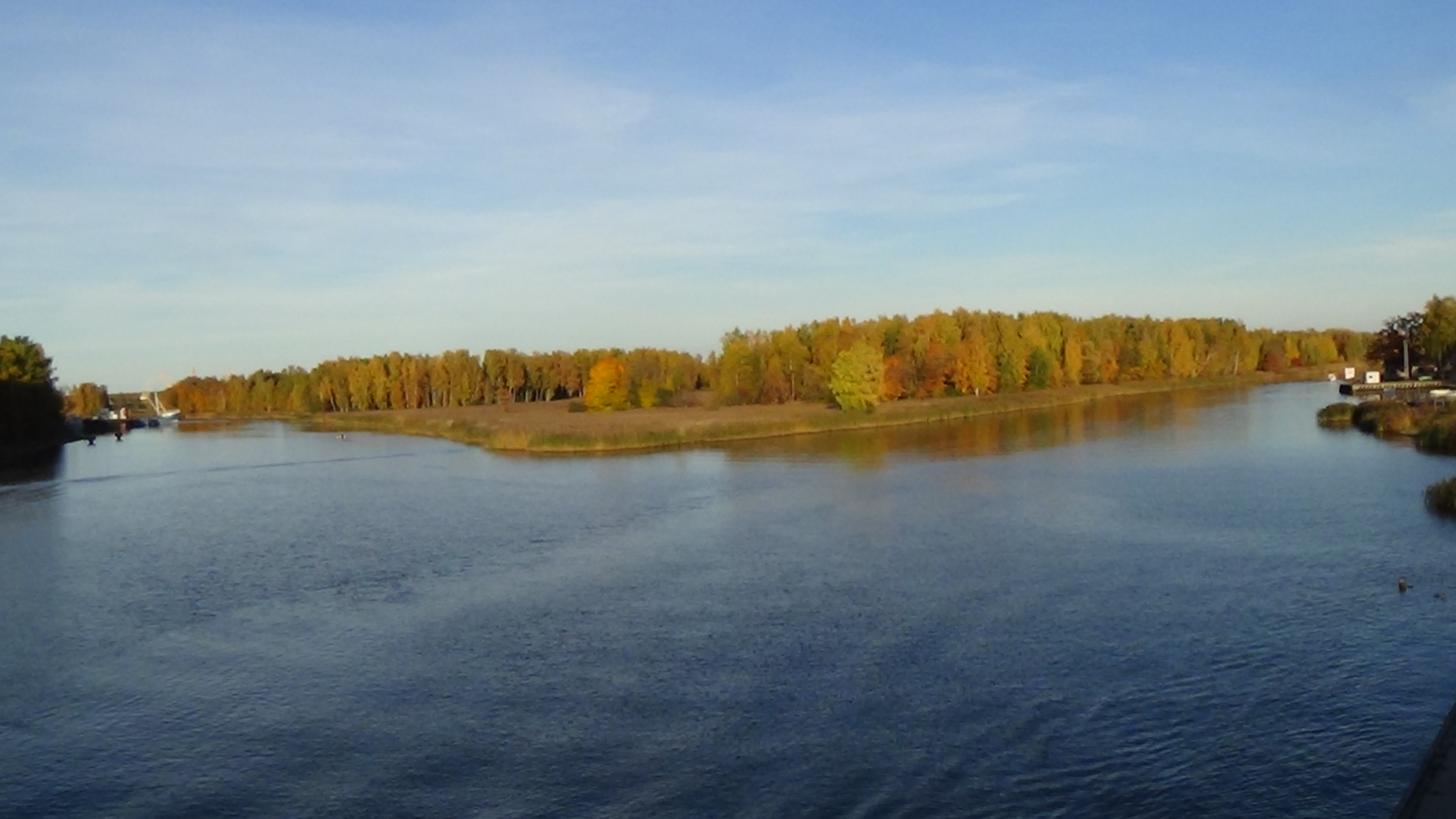
Mīlestības saliņa (Love Island)
