= Zasulauks =

Neighborhood of Riga, Latvia

Coordinates: 56°56′29″N 24°03′06″E

- Neighbourhood of Riga
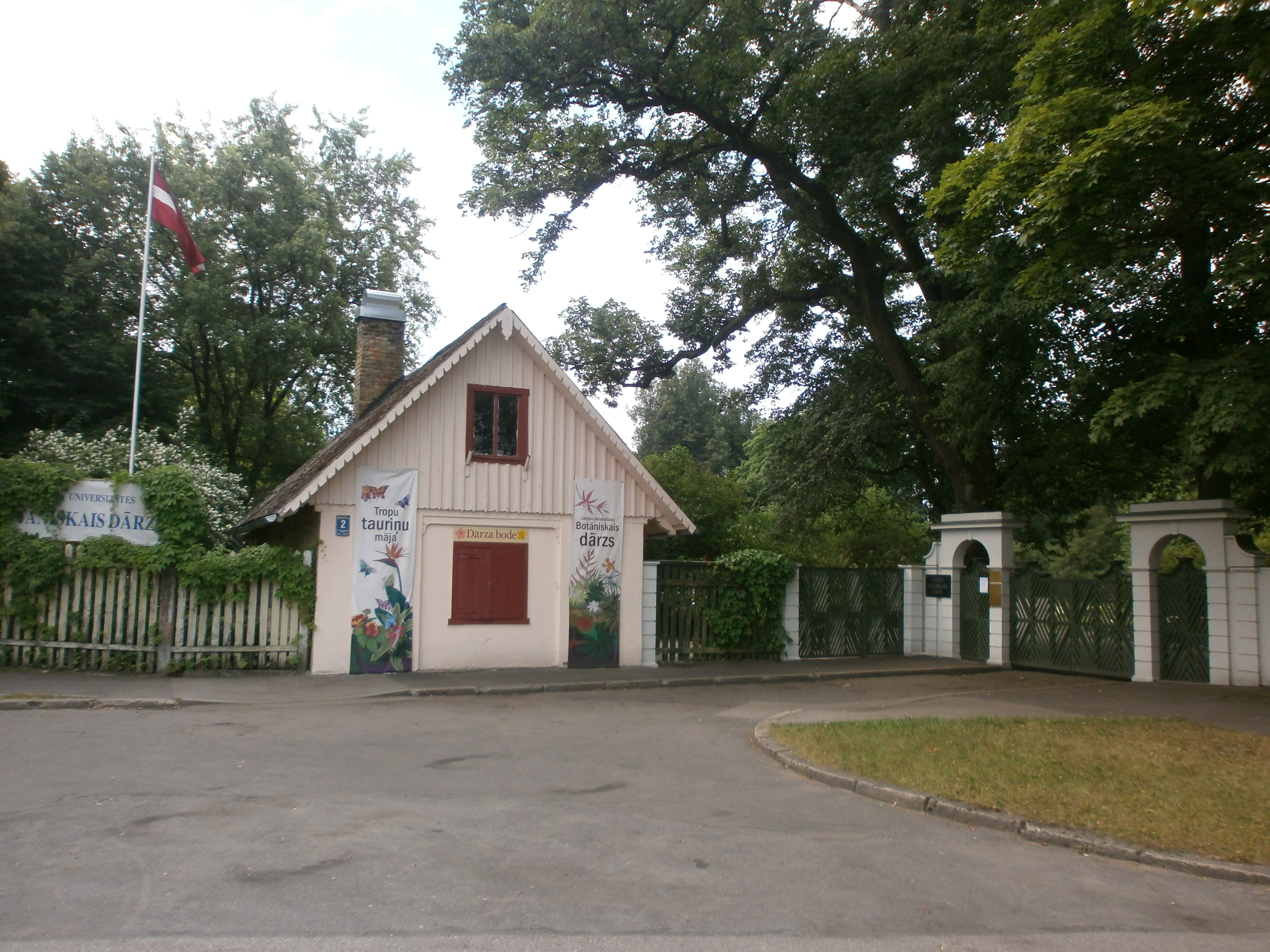
- University of Latvia Botanical Garden

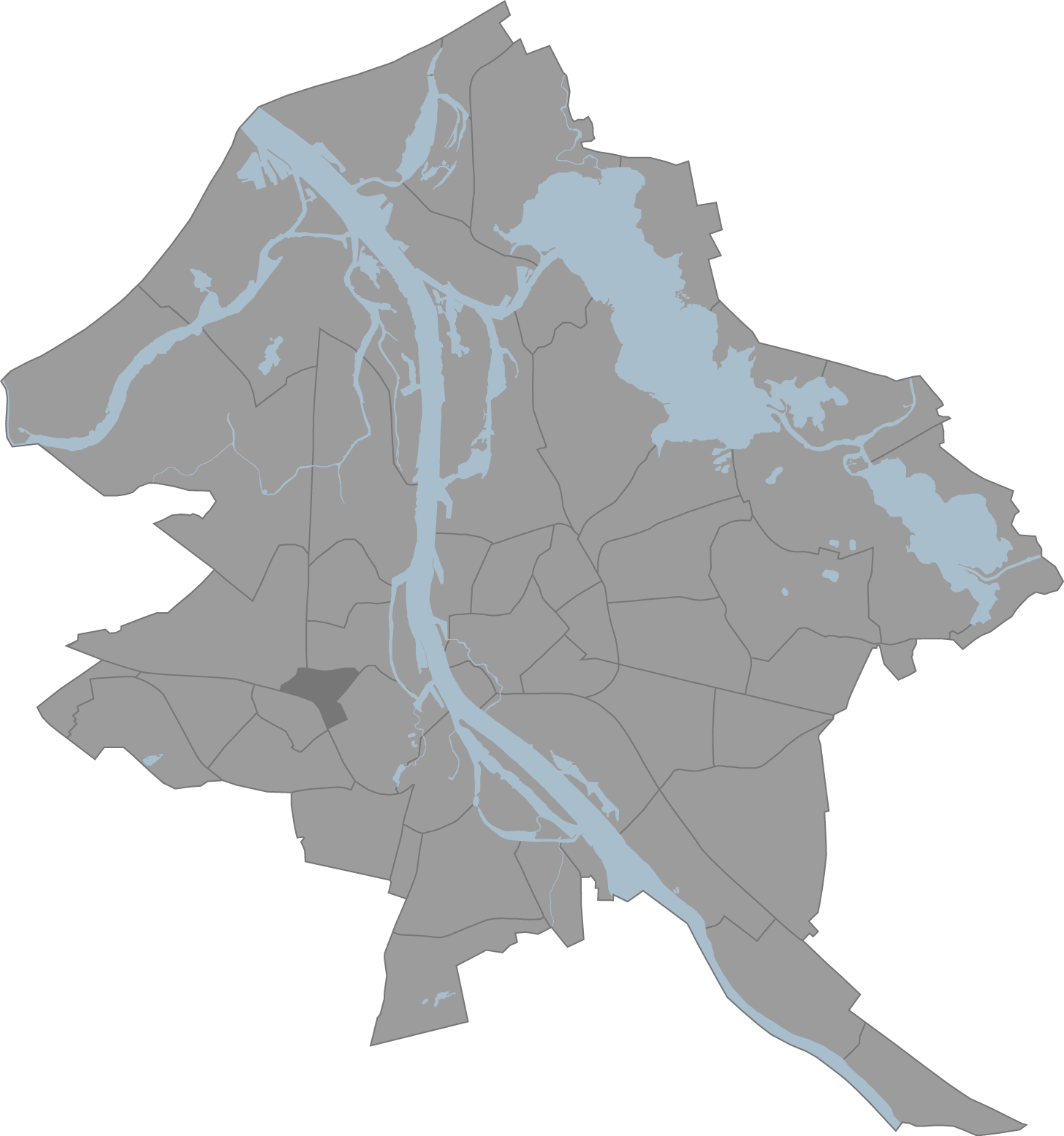
- Location of Zasulauks in Riga
- Country: Latvia
- City: Riga
- District: Kurzeme District

Area
  - Total: 1.190 km^{2} (0.459 sq mi)

Population (2024)
  - Total: 6,407
  - Density: 5,384/km^{2} (13,940/sq mi)
- Website: apkaimes.lv

Zasulauks is a neighbourhood of Riga, the capital of Latvia.

== History ==
The neighbourhood was named after Heinrich von Zass.
