= Kurzeme District, Riga =

Neighbourhood of Riga, Latvia

Coordinates: 56.996623°N 24.029045°E

Kurzeme District Kurzemes rajons
- Administrative district of Riga
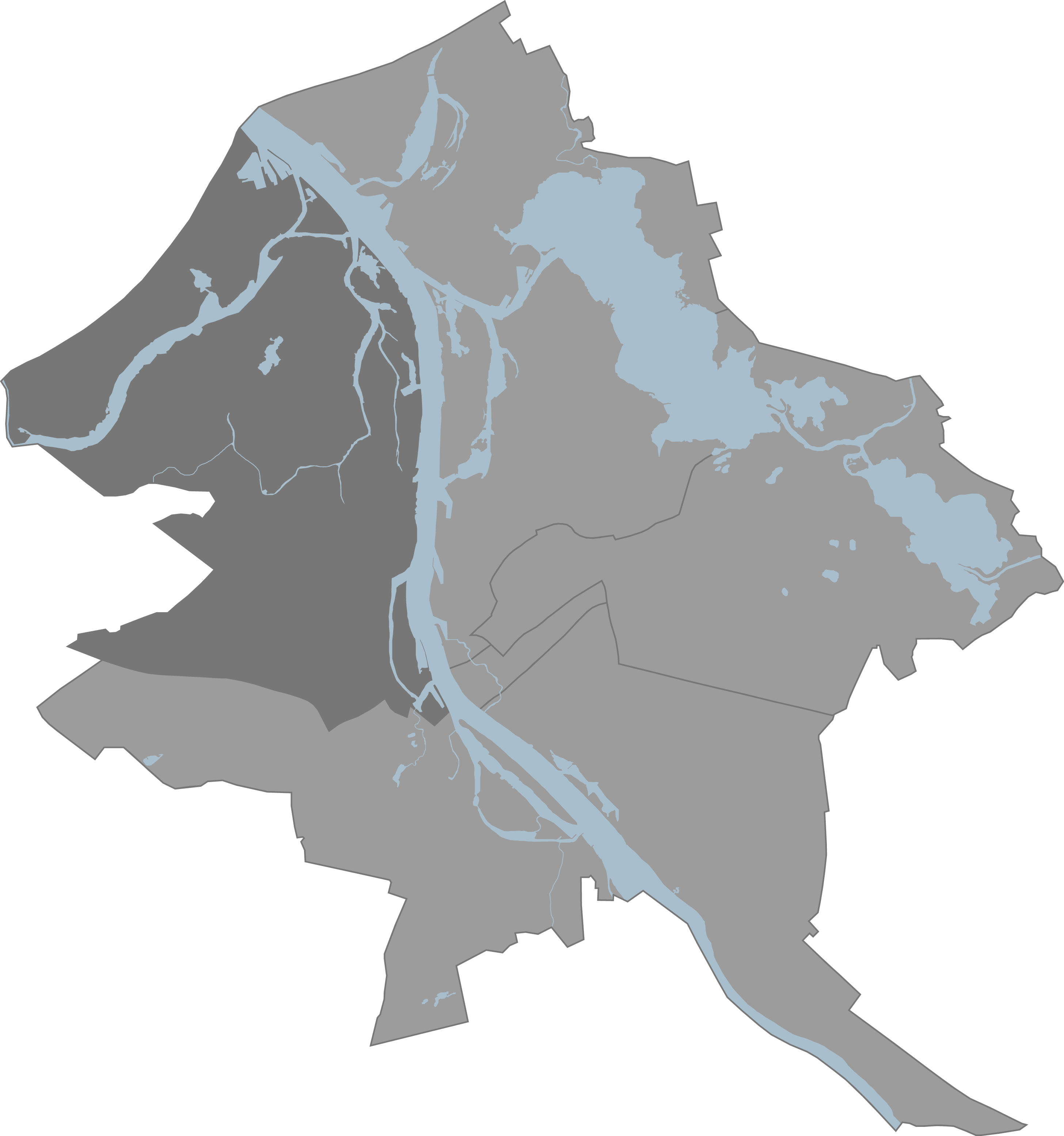
- Location in Riga
- Country: Latvia
- State city: Riga
- Neighbourhoods: List: Bolderāja; Buļļi; Daugavgrīva; Dzirciems; Iļģuciems; Imanta; Kleisti; Ķīpsala; Spilve; Voleri; Zasulauks; Āgenskalns (partial)

Kurzeme District (Latvian: Kurzemes rajons) is one of six administrative districts of Riga, the capital of Latvia.

Kurzeme is the Latvian name for Courland, a historical and cultural region of Latvia.
