= Atgāzene Station =

Railway station in Latvia

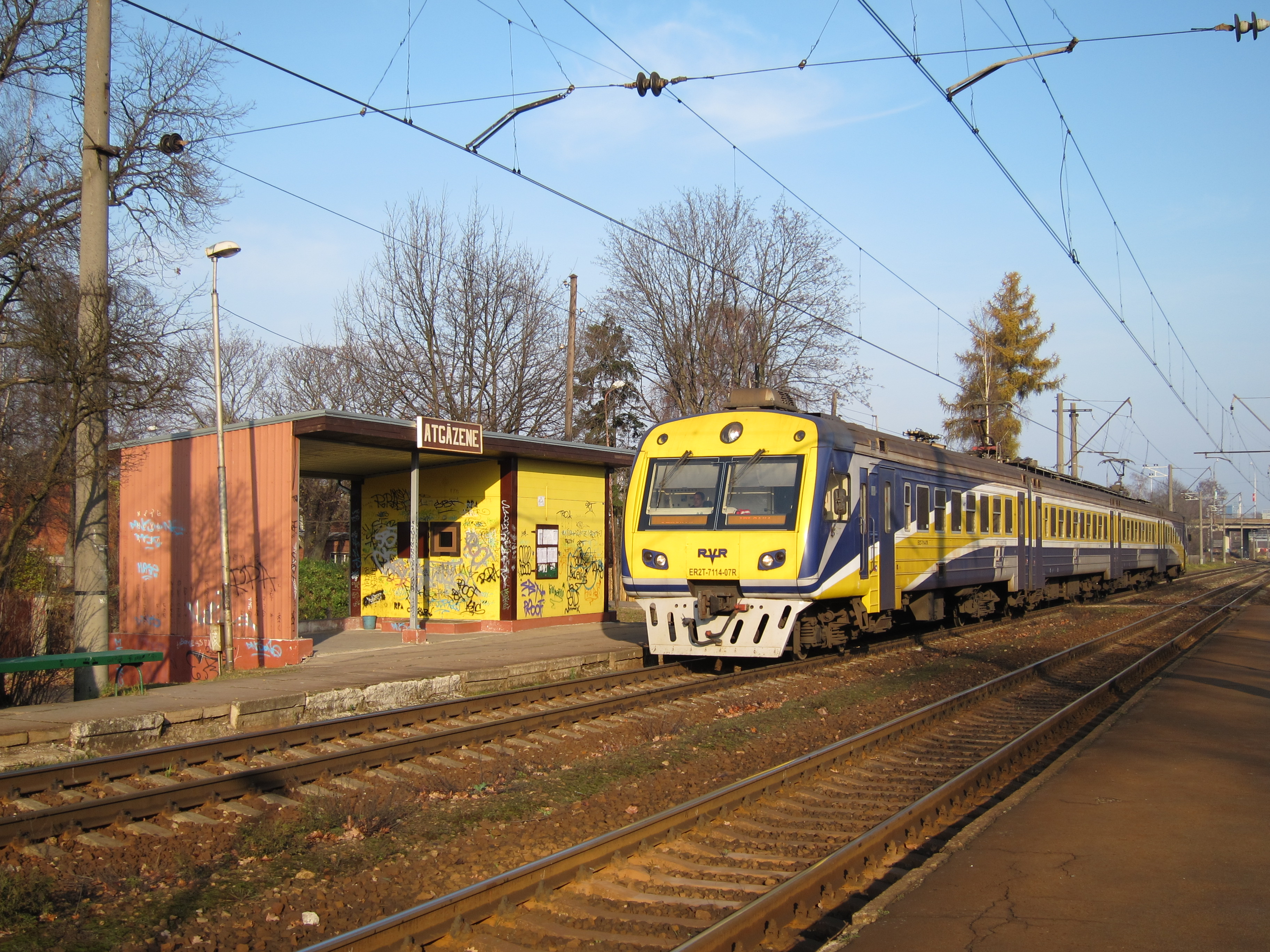

General information
- Location: Ģimnastikas iela 34A; Atgāzene, Zemgale Suburb, Rīga
- Coordinates: 56°55′3.67″N 24°4′47.23″E
- Line: Riga – Jelgava Railway
- Platforms: 2
- Tracks: 2

History
- Opened: 1928
- Closed: 2024
- Former names: Ģimnastikas iela

Former services
Preceding station	LDz	Following station
Turība towards Jelgava	Riga–Jelgava	Torņakalns towards Riga
Location
- Location within Latvia

Atgāzene Station is a closed railway station in the neighbourhood of Atgāzene in the Zemgale Suburb in Riga, Latvia. The station was located on the Riga – Jelgava Railway. On 12 June 2024, it was replaced by the Bieriņi / Bērnu slimnīca Station, which is located half a kilometer to the north.
