= Pērse =

River in Latvia

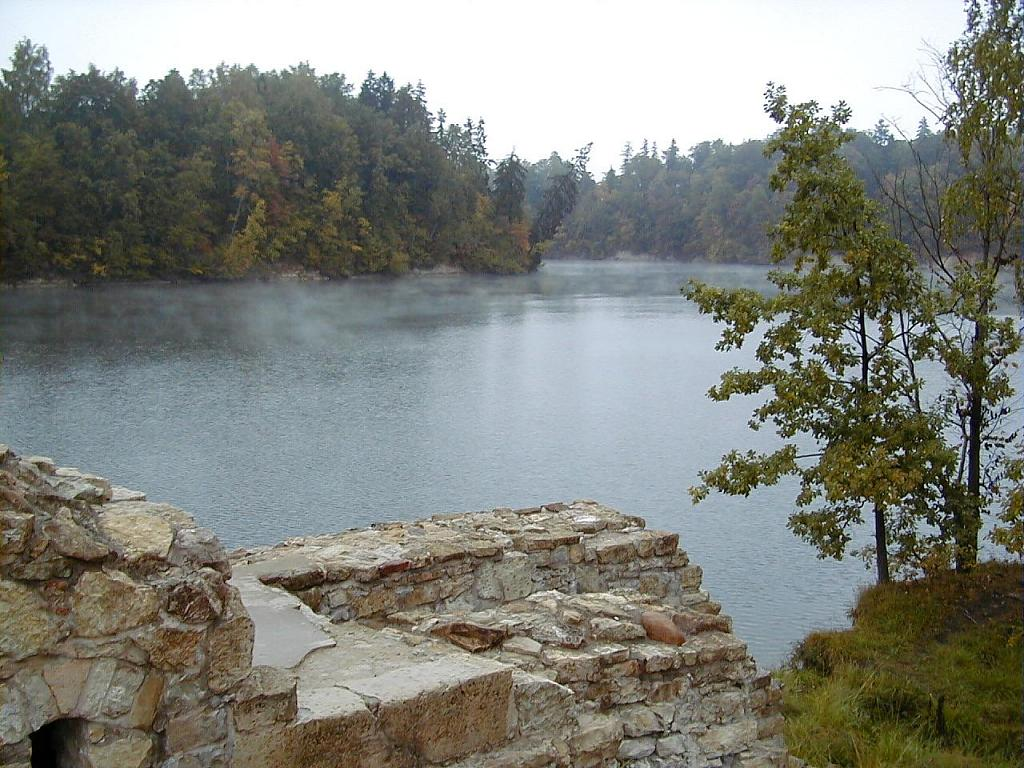
- The Pērse as seen from the Koknese castle ruins

Location
- Country: Latvia,

Physical characteristics
- Source
  - location: Kārdace forest. Sausnēja parish
  - elevation: 122 m (400 ft)
- Mouth: Daugava
  - location: Koknese
  - coordinates: 56.6380°N 25.4154°E
- Length: 50 km (31 mi)
- Basin size: 325 km^{2} (125 sq mi)

Basin features
- Progression: Daugava→ Baltic Sea

The Pērse is a right tributary to the river Daugava in Latvia, flowing through Ērgļi, Pļaviņas and Koknese municipalities. The river crosses roads A6, P79, P80 and the Riga-Krustpils railway line.

The 50-km long Pērse begins in Kārdeces forest in Sausnēja parish.
