= Roman Mashkov =

Hero of the Soviet Union

- Russian: Роман Спиридонович Машков
- Born: September 24, 1922; Bolshiye Goly in Irkutsk Oblast, USSR
- Died: July 22, 1971 (aged 48); Novokhopyorsk in Voronezh Oblast, USSR
- Military career
- Allegiance: Soviet Union
- Branch: Red Army
- Service years: 1942–1945
- Rank: Lieutenant
- Units: Commander of the intelligence platoon of 5th motorized infantry brigade of 5th Tank Corps, 2nd Baltic Front
- Conflicts: Attack on Ērgļi railway station
- Awards: Hero of the Soviet Union; Order of Lenin; Order of the Red Star
- Other work: Was engaged in country work in collective farm

Roman Spiridonovich Mashkov (Russian: Рома́н Спиридо́нович Машко́в; September 24, 1922 – July 22, 1971) was the commander of a Soviet reconnaissance platoon during World War II. He was awarded the Soviet Union's highest award for military valour, the Hero of the Soviet Union.

== Biography ==
Mashkov was born on September 24, 1922, to a Russian peasant family in Bolshiye Goly, a village in the Kachugsky District of Irkutsk Oblast. After completing seven years of primary school in his home town, he worked on a collective farm.

In October 1941, Mashkov was conscripted into the Red Army during a Komsomol mobilization and then served in the Soviet Airborne Forces. Beginning in April 1942, he commanded an infantry reconnaissance platoon in battles on the Northwestern and Kalinin Fronts. In December 1943, he took command of the reconnaissance platoon of a motor rifle battalion.

He served as the commander of a reconnaissance platoon of the 5th Motor Rifle Brigade of the 5th Tank Corps of the 2nd Baltic Front and participated in the battle for Latvia. On August 21, 1944, under the command of Major Korney Dityuk, Mashkov was deployed in a mechanized infantry battalion that attacked the Ērgļi railway station in the Madona Municipality of Latvia (now the Ērgļi municipality). The day after, the battalion was cut off from the brigade's main forces. As the platoon fought to hold its position, Lieutenant Mashkov commanded eight soldiers to hold off the enemy attacks, killing ten German soldiers in the process. During the attack, he fired bullets from a mounted machine gun. Afterwards, he supplied information on the deployment and location of German soldiers and artillery.

Later on, Mashkov was in charge of several reconnaissance sorties. During one of them, he discovered the location of the headquarters of a German division. Mashkov led an attack on the headquarters, seized documents and killed the German division commander.

Mashkov played an essential role in preparing an exit strategy for the battalion and breaking through the enemy defenses. He delivered intelligence on positions of German weapons emplacements to Dityuk. For his accomplishments, Mashkov was awarded the title of Hero of the Soviet Union on 24 March 1945. Dityuk and Starshina Gennady Myakshin from the battalion were also made Heroes of the Soviet Union.

He was wounded four times during the war, returning to the front lines shortly after each treatment. He was present in Berlin on Russian Victory Day.

After World War II, Mashkov was transferred to the reserve. Demobilized, he returned home to a hero's welcome in August 1946 and addressed the Second Pyatiletka kolkhoz, telling them that he would "rest a little after the road" and "take up his native peasant business." In his retirement, he moved to Novokhopyorsk in Voronezh Oblast, where he died on July 22, 1971.

Mashkov was awarded the Order of Lenin, the Gold Star medal (No. 8936), and various other medals. A memorial bust of Moshkov is part of the World War II Victory Memorial in the city of Novokhopyorsk.
