= Bieriņi / Bērnu slimnīca Station =

Railway station in Riga, Latvia

Bieriņi / Bērnu slimnīca
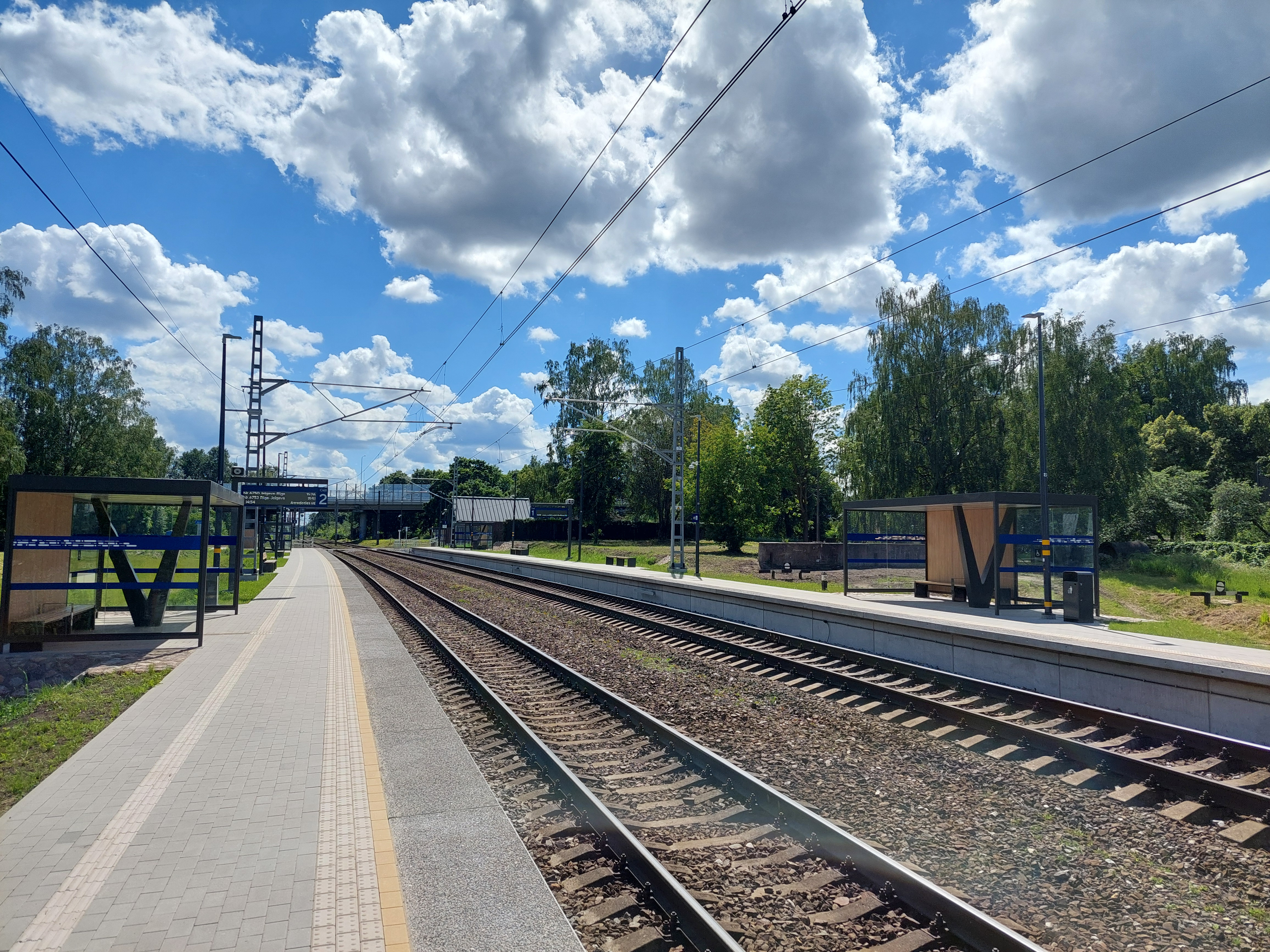

General information
- Location: Zemgale Suburb, Rīga; Latvia
- Coordinates: 56.921667°N 24.081389°E
- Platforms: 2
- Tracks: 2

Services
Preceding station	LDz	Following station
Turība towards Jelgava	Riga–Jelgava	Torņakalns towards Riga
Location

Bieriņi / Bērnu slimnīca Station is a railway station in the Zemgale Suburb in Riga, Latvia, located on the western bank of the Daugava River. It is located in the vicinity of the Children's Clinical University Hospital, after which it is named.

The station is located on the Riga–Jelgava line. The stop was opened on 12 June 2024, and at the same time the Atgāzene stop, which was located half a kilometer to the south of the station, was closed. Electric trains running on the line stop at the stop (diesel trains do not stop).

== Services ==
Operator	Route	Status
(Latvia) Pasažieru vilciens ("Vivi")	Rīga — Jelgava	In service
(Latvia) Pasažieru vilciens ("Vivi")	Jelgava — Rīga	In service

== Gallery images ==
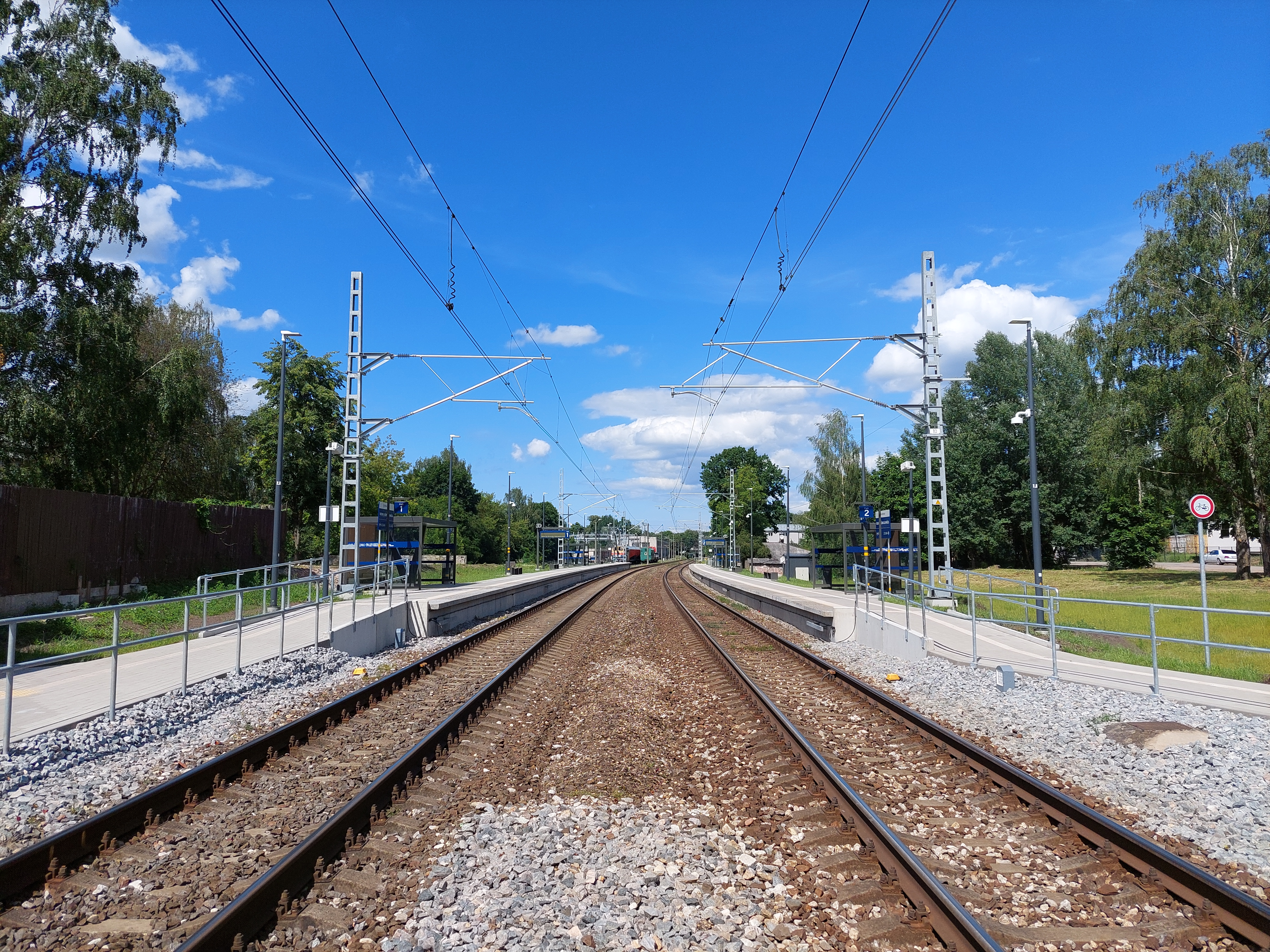
View in the direction of Riga

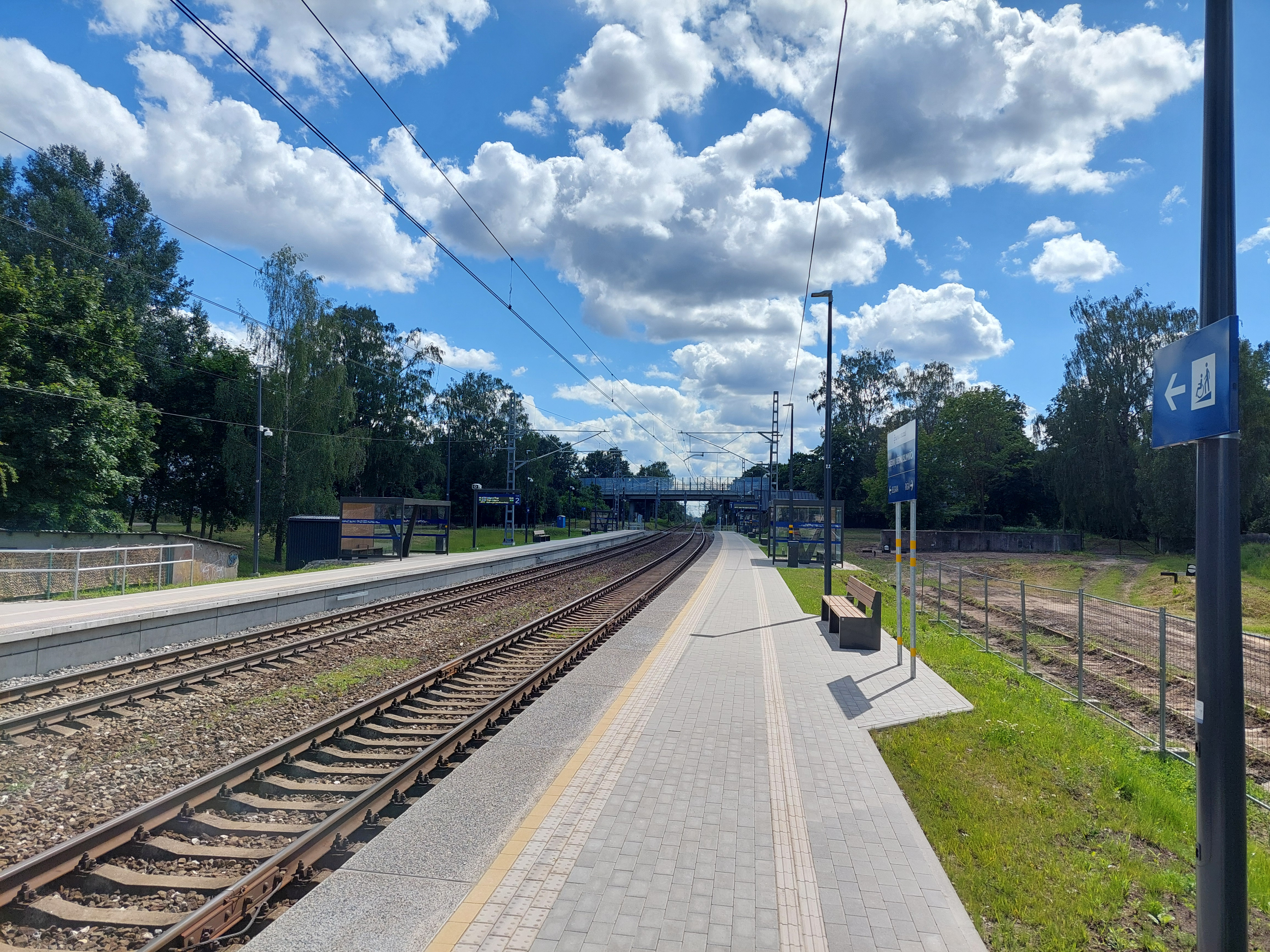
View in the direction of Jelgava

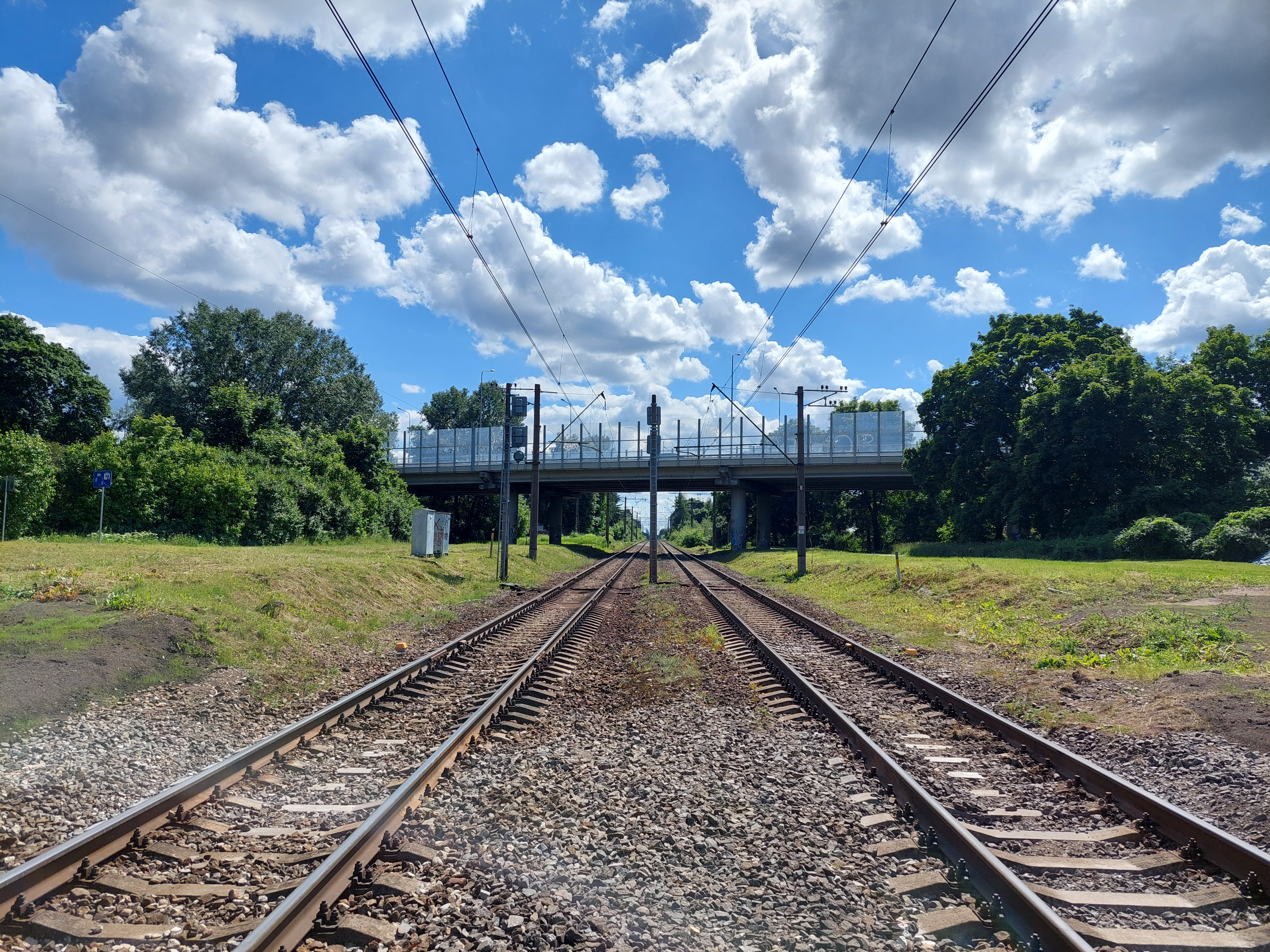
Tracks in the direction of Jelgava

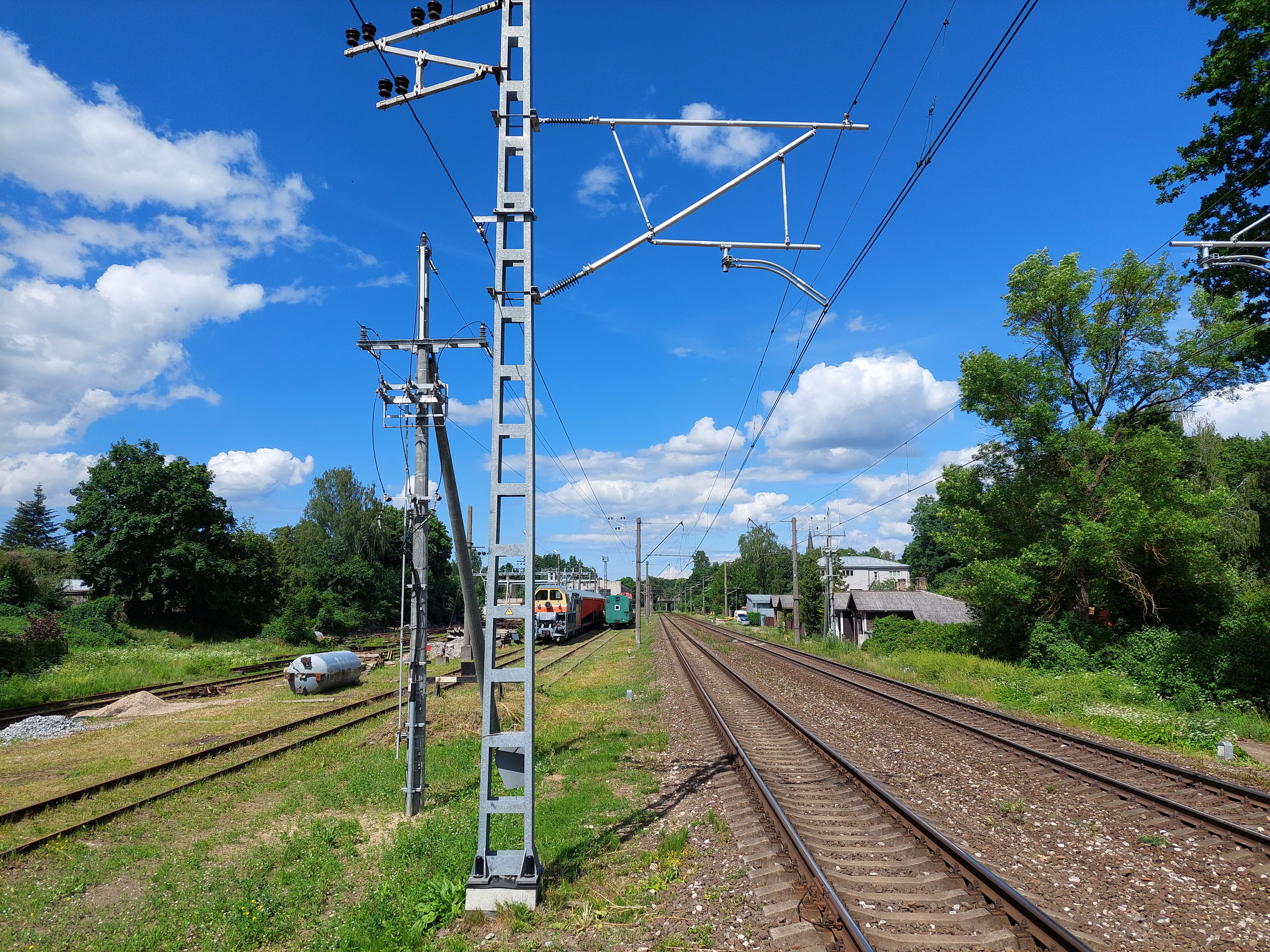
Tracks in the direction of Riga

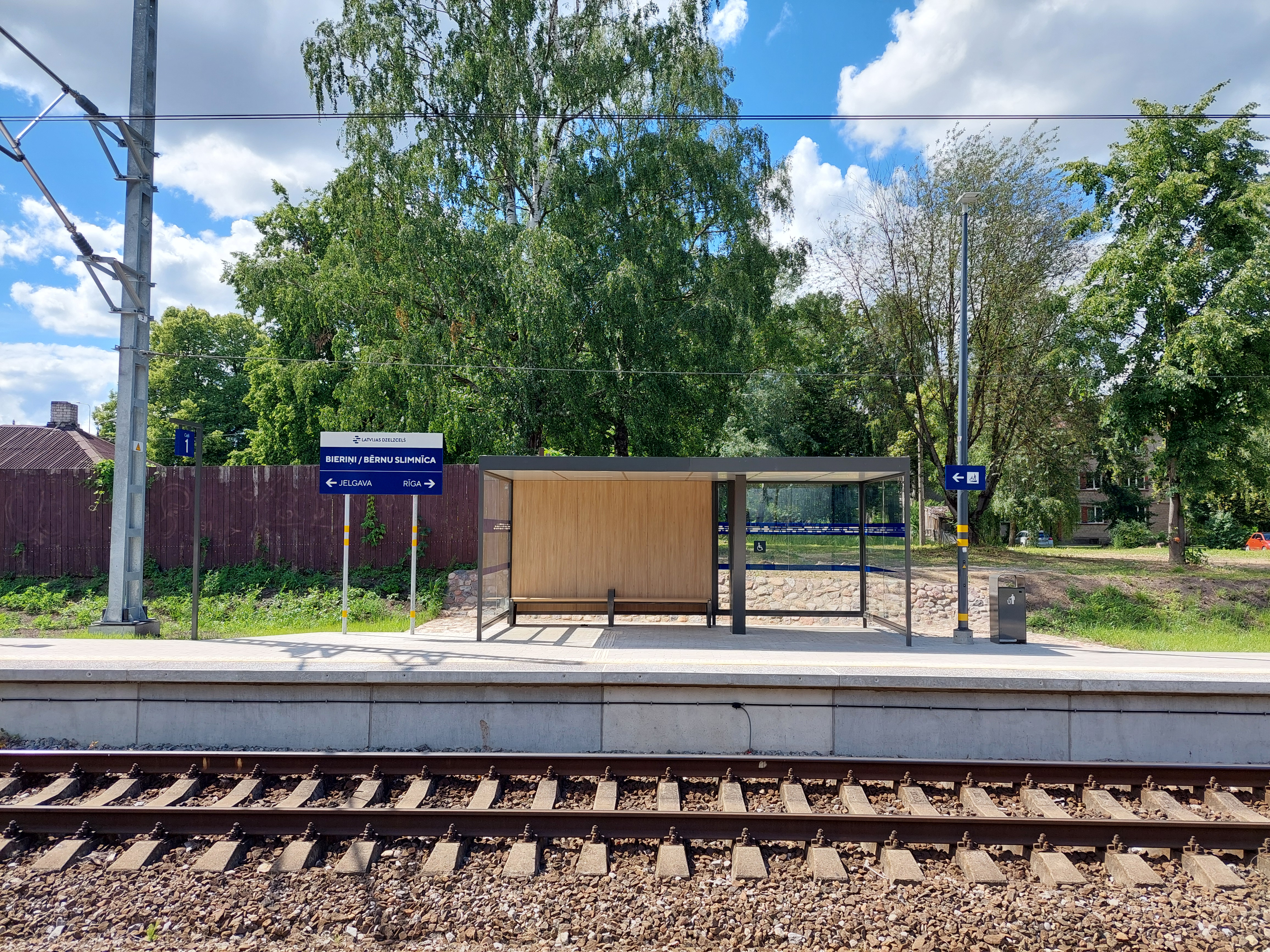
New station signage

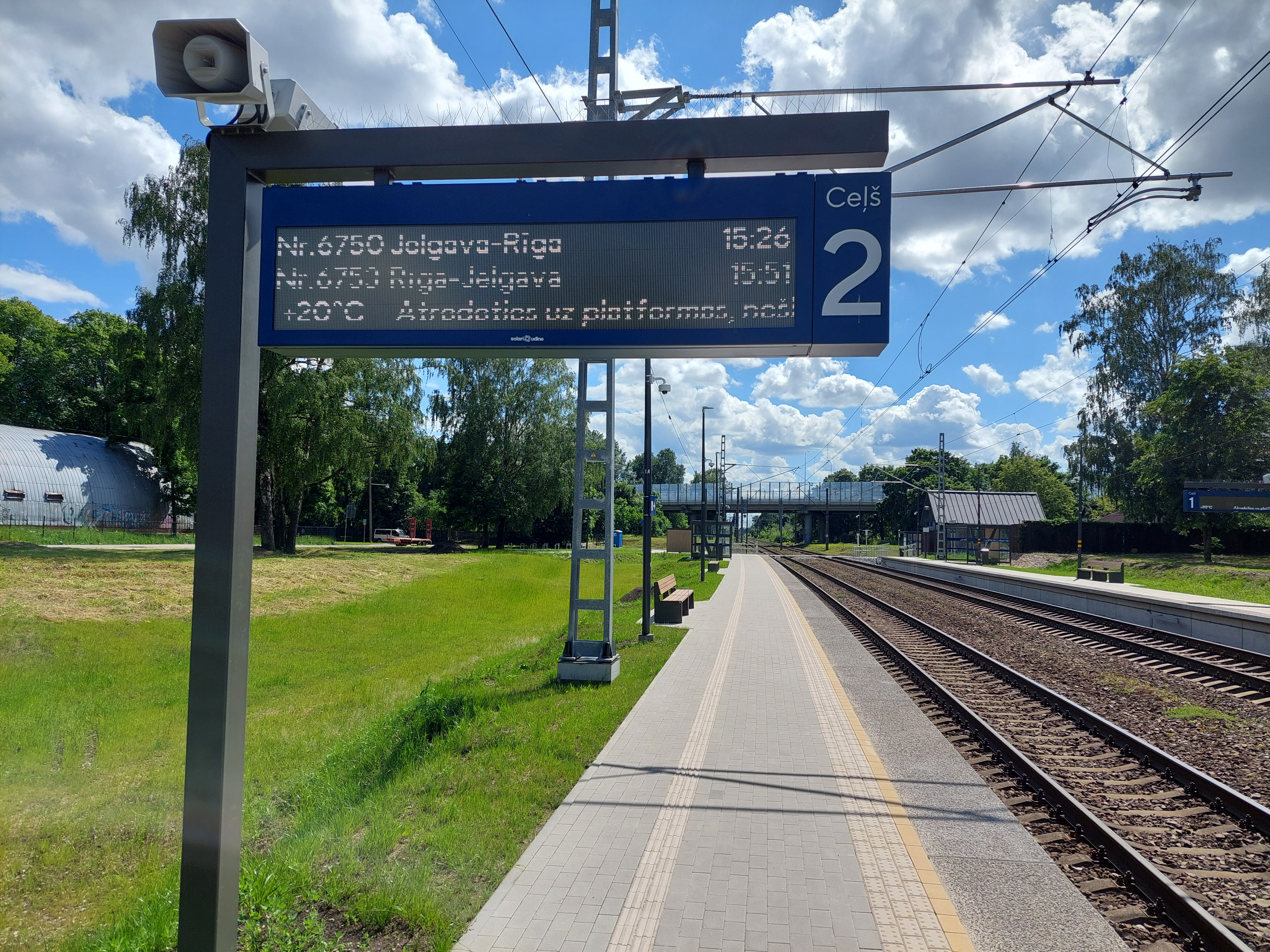
Information display
