= Ērgļi Municipality =

Municipality of Latvia

Coordinates: 56°53′51″N 25°38′15″E

Ērgļi Municipality Ērgļu novads
- Municipality
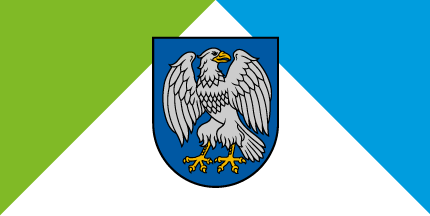
- Flag Coat of arms

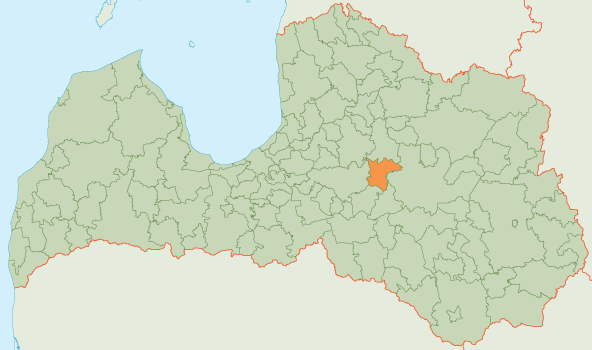
- Country: Latvia
- Formed: 2006
- Centre: Ērgļi

Government
  - Chairman: Guntars Velcis (We – For Ērgļi Municipality)

Area
  - Total: 379.11 km^{2} (146.38 sq mi)
  - Land: 368.86 km^{2} (142.42 sq mi)
  - Water: 10.25 km^{2} (3.96 sq mi)

Population (2021)
  - Total: 2,600
  - Density: 7.0/km^{2} (18/sq mi)
- Website: www.ergli.lv

Ērgļi Municipality (Latvian: Ērgļu novads) is a former municipality in Vidzeme, Latvia. The municipality was formed in 2006 by merging Ērgļi Parish, Jumurda Parish and Sausnēja Parish, the administrative centre being Ērgļi. The population in 2020 was 2,611.

On 1 July 2021, Ērgļi Municipality ceased to exist and its territory was merged into Madona Municipality.

== See also ==
- Administrative divisions of Latvia
