= Torņakalns Station =

Railway station in Riga, Latvia

Torņakalns
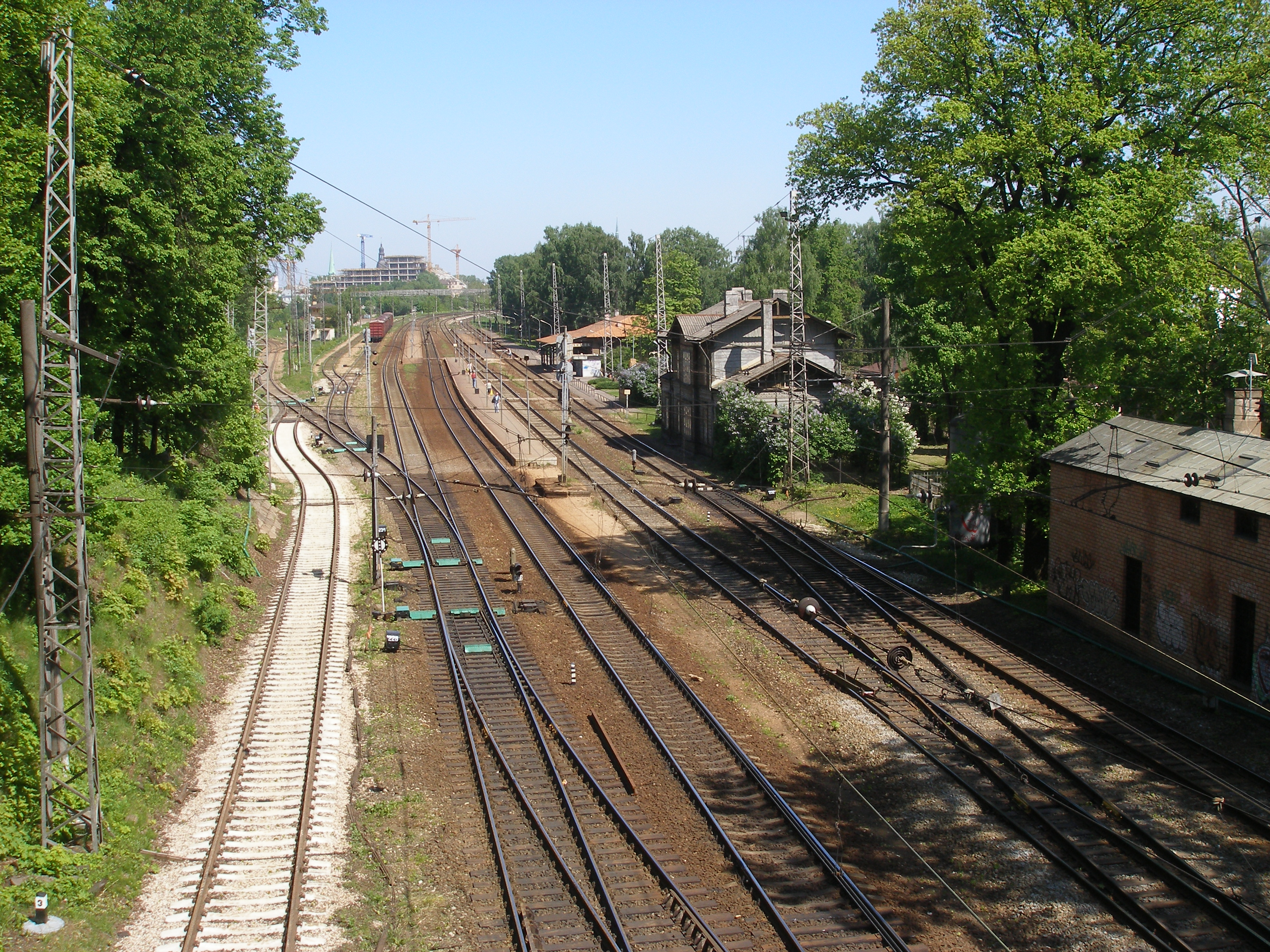
- Torņakalns Station in 2010

General information
- Location: Vilkaines iela 1 Torņakalns, Zemgale Suburb, Rīga; Latvia
- Coordinates: 56°55′56″N 24°5′21″E
- Owner: Latvijas dzelzceļš (LDz)
- Lines: Riga–Tukums; Riga–Jelgava
- Platforms: 4
- Tracks: 6
- Train operators: Pasažieru vilciens (Vivi)

History
- Opened: 1868
- Former names: Riga-Mitauer Bahnhof; Riga III

Services
| Preceding station | LDz | Following station |
|---|---|---|
| Zasulauks towards Tukums II | Torņakalns–Tukums II Railway | Riga Terminus |
| Bieriņi / Bērnu slimnīca towards Jelgava | Riga–Jelgava | Riga Terminus |
Location

Torņakalns Station is a railway station in the neighbourhood of Torņakalns in the Zemgale Suburb in Riga, Latvia, located on the western bank of the Daugava River. Torņakalns Station is located on the Riga–Jelgava and Riga–Tukums railway lines. The station opened in 1868 as the northern terminus of the Riga–Jelgava railway line. From 1872, however, all trains were continued from the station via the Iron Bridge across the Daugava to the current Riga Central Station. In 1877, Torņakalns Station also became the eastern terminus of the Torņakalns–Tukums railway line.

== History ==
The terminal of Riga–Jelgava Railway was opened in 1868 and called Riga-Mitauer Bahnhof back then. This was a very important station, which secured the connection of Riga with Semigallia, but in 1872 one year after construction of the railway bridge across the Daugava, it lost its significance and was renamed Riga III, and later Riga III Commodity Station, which was part of the joint Torņakalns station. The Jelgava station was located north of the present Torņakalns station between Uzvaras Boulevard and Akmeņu Street. Nowadays the old station building is partly preserved at Akmeņu street 19 (the former address - Akmeņu iela 38) as a dwelling house.

In 1877, trains running along the new line Riga-Tukums line began to stop in Torņakalns.

== Architecture ==
The present station building was built in the middle of the 1980s.

== Operations ==
In 1950, after the electrification of the Riga-Dubulti railway section, electric trains began to stop in Tornakalns. In December 1972, the Riga-Jelgava line was electrified and the electric trains in that direction was in service as well. By August 15, 2001, the diesel train Riga–Liepāja was decommissioned. As of February 15, 2010, the diesel train Riga–Reņģe continued to operate every day.

== See also ==
- Torņakalns Memorial to Victims of Communist Terror
- Rail transport in Latvia
- History of rail transport in Latvia
- Transport in Latvia

== Referencer ==
=== Bibliography ===
- Altbergs, T.; Augustāne, K.; Pētersone, I. (2009). Dzelzceļi Latvijā [Railways in Latvia] (in Latvian). Jumava. ISBN 978-9984-38-698-0.
