= Bolshiye Goly =

Bolshiye Goly Большие Голы
- Village
- Interactive map of Bolshiye Goly
- Location of Bolshiye Goly Bolshiye Goly (Irkutsk Oblast)
- Coordinates: 53°52′16″N 106°00′19″E
- Country: Russia
- Federal subject: Irkutsk Oblast
- Administrative district: Kachugsky District
- Founded: 1720

Population
  - Estimate (2012): 147 )

Municipal status
  - Municipal district: Kachugsky Municipal District
  - Rural settlement: Kachugskoye Rural Settlement
- Time zone: UTC+8 (MSK+5)
- Postal code: 666202
- OKTMO ID: 25618431106

Bolshiye Goly (Russian: Больши́е Го́лы) is a rural locality (a village) in Kachugsky District of Irkutsk Oblast, Russia, located on the Lena River.

== History ==
According to the locals, the village was established in 1720. Throughout its existence, the majority of its inhabitants have had jobs based around arable farming and cattle cultivation. In the 18th-19th centuries, the village was famous for manufacturing of the big and small boats.

== Notable people ==
Roman Mashkov, the Hero of the Soviet Union, was born in the village on September 22, 1922. He left for the war front in October 1941 and returned in 1945 to continue working in the village.
