= Torņakalns =

Neighbourhood of Riga

Coordinates: 56°56′N 24°05′E

- Neighborhood of Riga
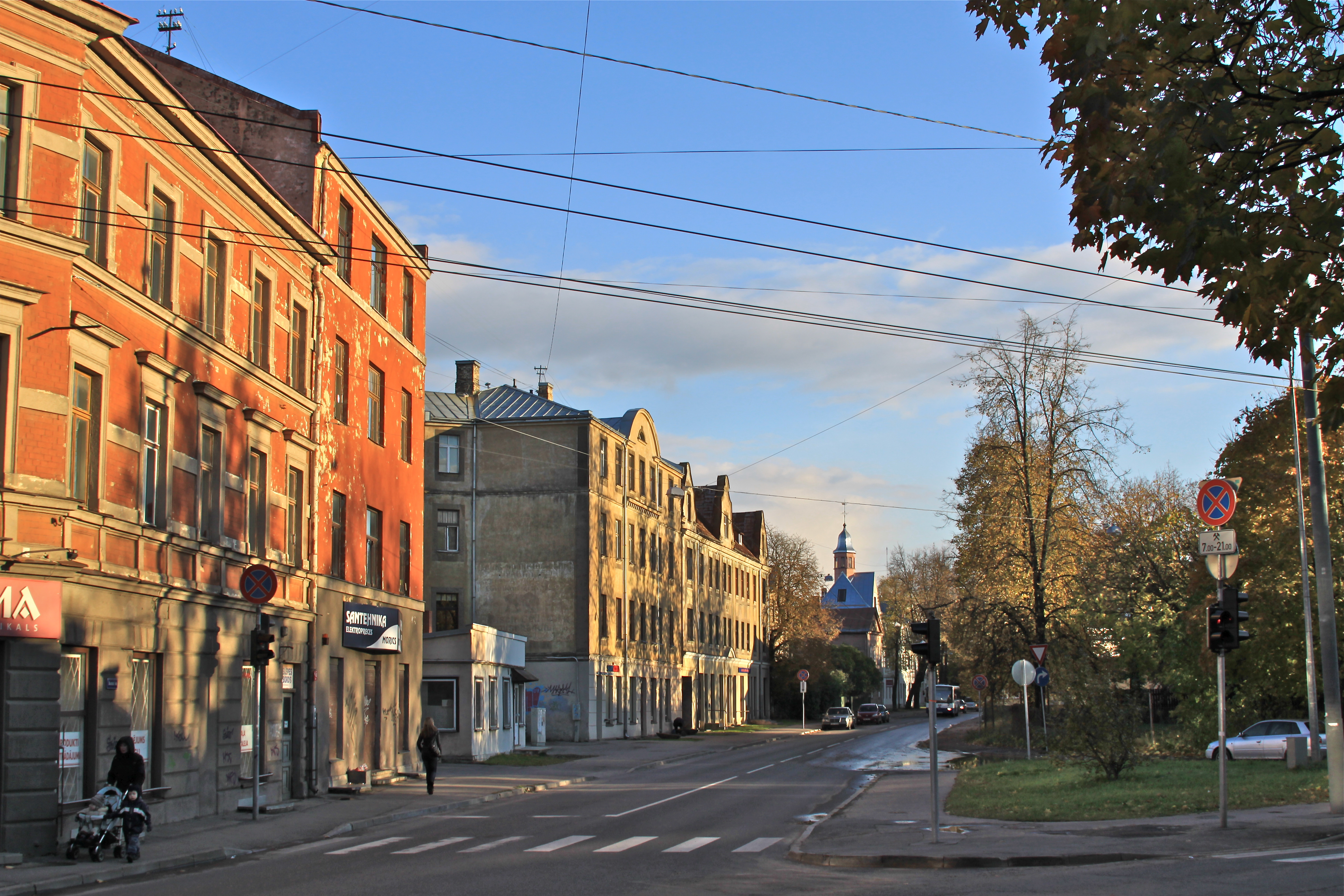
- Bauskas Street in Torņakalns

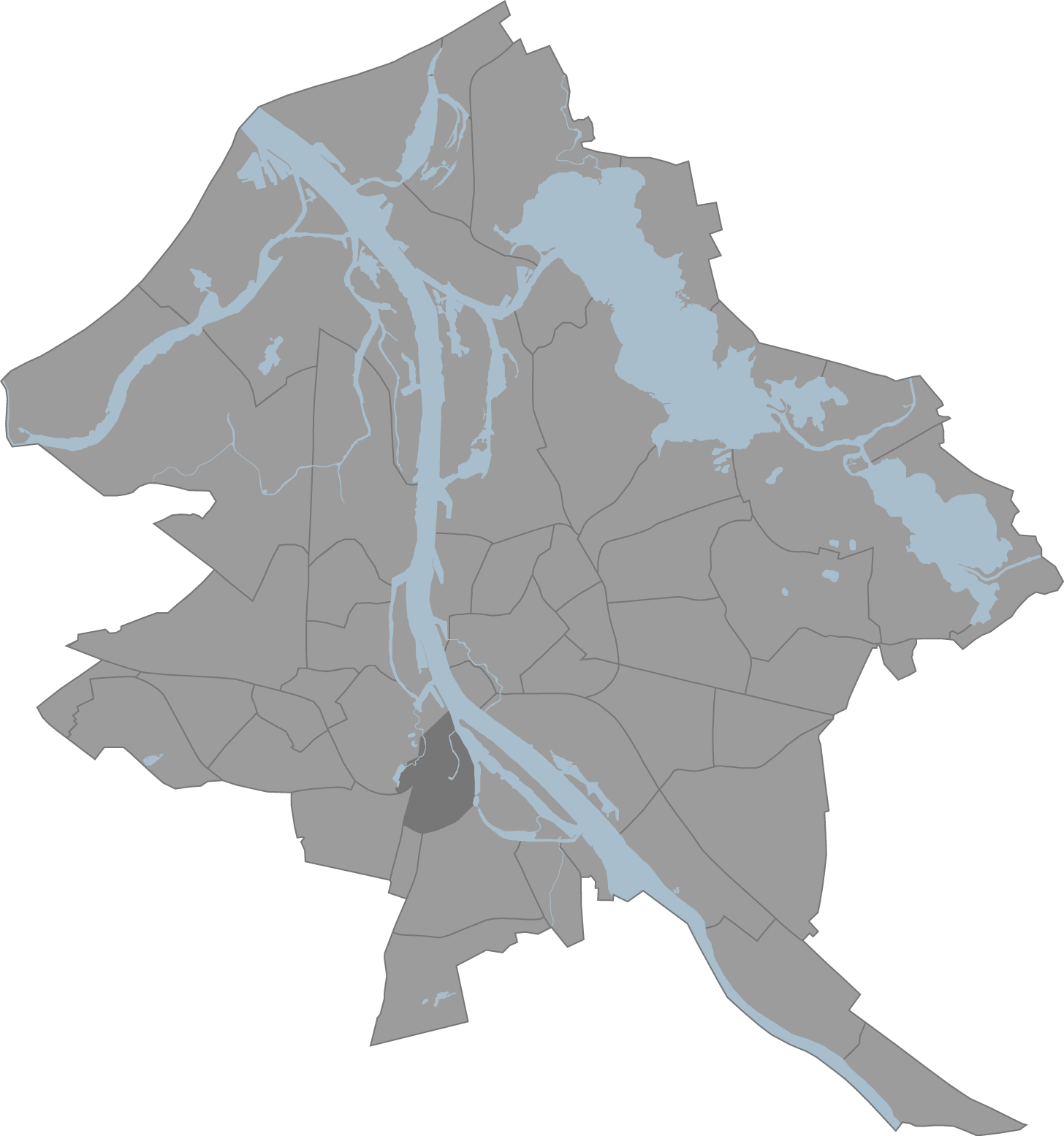
- Location of Torņakalns in Riga
- Country: Latvia
- City: Riga
- District: Zemgale Suburb

Area
  - Total: 3.210 km^{2} (1.239 sq mi)

Population (2024)
  - Total: 6,004
  - Density: 1,870/km^{2} (4,844/sq mi)
- Time zone: UTC+2 (EET)
  - Summer (DST): UTC+3 (EEST)
- Website: apkaimes.lv

Torņakalns is a neighbourhood of Riga, Latvia located on the western bank of the Daugava River (neighbourhoods along this shore are collectively known as Pārdaugava). The name Torņakalns (English: Tower Hill) derives from a fortified tower built in the Middle Ages close to the Daugava River to alert the city of Riga in case of emergency and intruders about to cross the river. The tower does not stand any more.

== Overview ==
Torņakalns was an early suburb of Riga, consisting largely of gardens and mansions. In contrast to the Soviet-built Zolitūde and Ziepniekkalns suburbs, there are plenty of gardens, parks, and monuments. Mārupes parks (eng.:Mary's Creek Park) encircles the Māras dīķis (eng.:Mary's Pond), which was once dammed by a mill. The Mārupe (eng.:Mary's Creek) then continues into Arkādijas parks (eng.:Arcadian Park), where early 20th century landscaping provides an oasis from the city.

== History ==
In 1940, the Soviet Union annexed Latvia and began mass deportations of Latvians who were deemed to be political and social threats to the new communist government. Because Torņakalns contained a number of affluent residents, these deportations took place at the Torņakalns railway station. Many of the mansions were confiscated, with some being divided into smaller units, and others turned to public use, including kindergartens and clinics. During World War II, the railway service between Riga and Torņakalns was suspended, following the destruction of the original railway trestle over the Daugava.

Following the war, the neighborhood experienced an influx of non-Latvian Soviet citizens, reducing the ethnic Latvian percentage of the population. In the postwar development, the railway was electrified, streetcar service was expanded, factories and a military arsenal provided jobs in the neighborhood.

Following the restoration of Latvian independence in 1991, many non-Latvians left the country, and Soviet-era street names were removed. A boxcar was installed at the Torņakalns station as a memorial to the Stalinist deportations. It is dedicated to the 140,068 victims of Communist terror, of which 7,568 were subject to Soviet deportations from Latvia and 82,500 of arrested and otherwise repressed during 1940-1945. At the same time, a Soviet victory monument, the Monument to the Liberators of Soviet Latvia and Riga from the German Fascist Invaders on the neighborhood's northern edge remained. It remained a focal symbol for the city's Russian community and was demolished in 2022 as a symbol of Soviet re-occupation of Latvia during WWII.

The main shopping venues for local residents include the Āgenskalns tirgus (Āgenskalns Market) and Vienības Gatve. In spite of initial economic uncertainty following independence, the neighborhood has since regained its status as a garden suburb within minutes of Old Riga. Most Torņakalns residents commute to the central business district by the electric railway, which contains a large Torņakalns Station and railyard in the neighborhood.

== Gallery ==
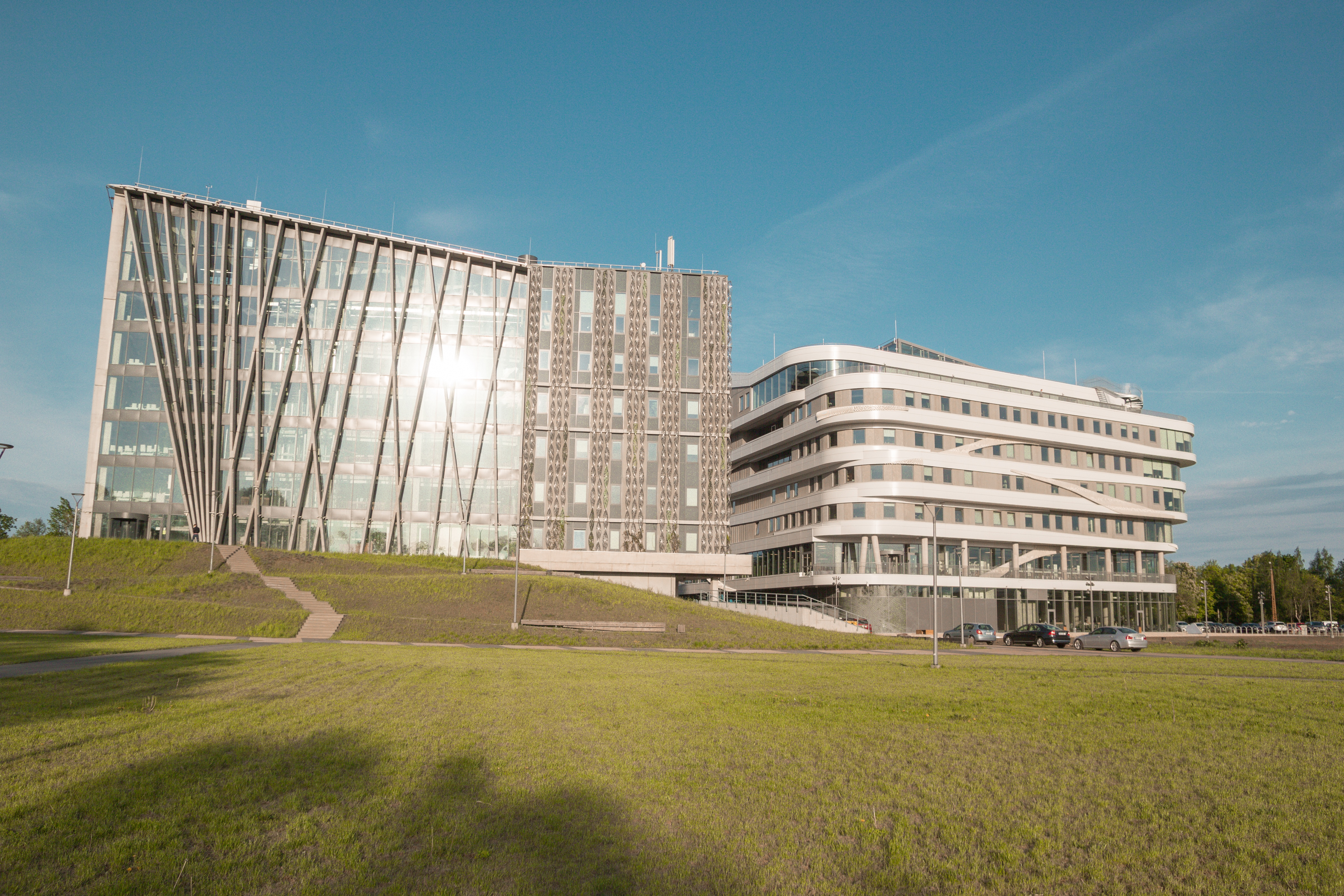
The new campus of the University of Latvia in Jelgavas Street

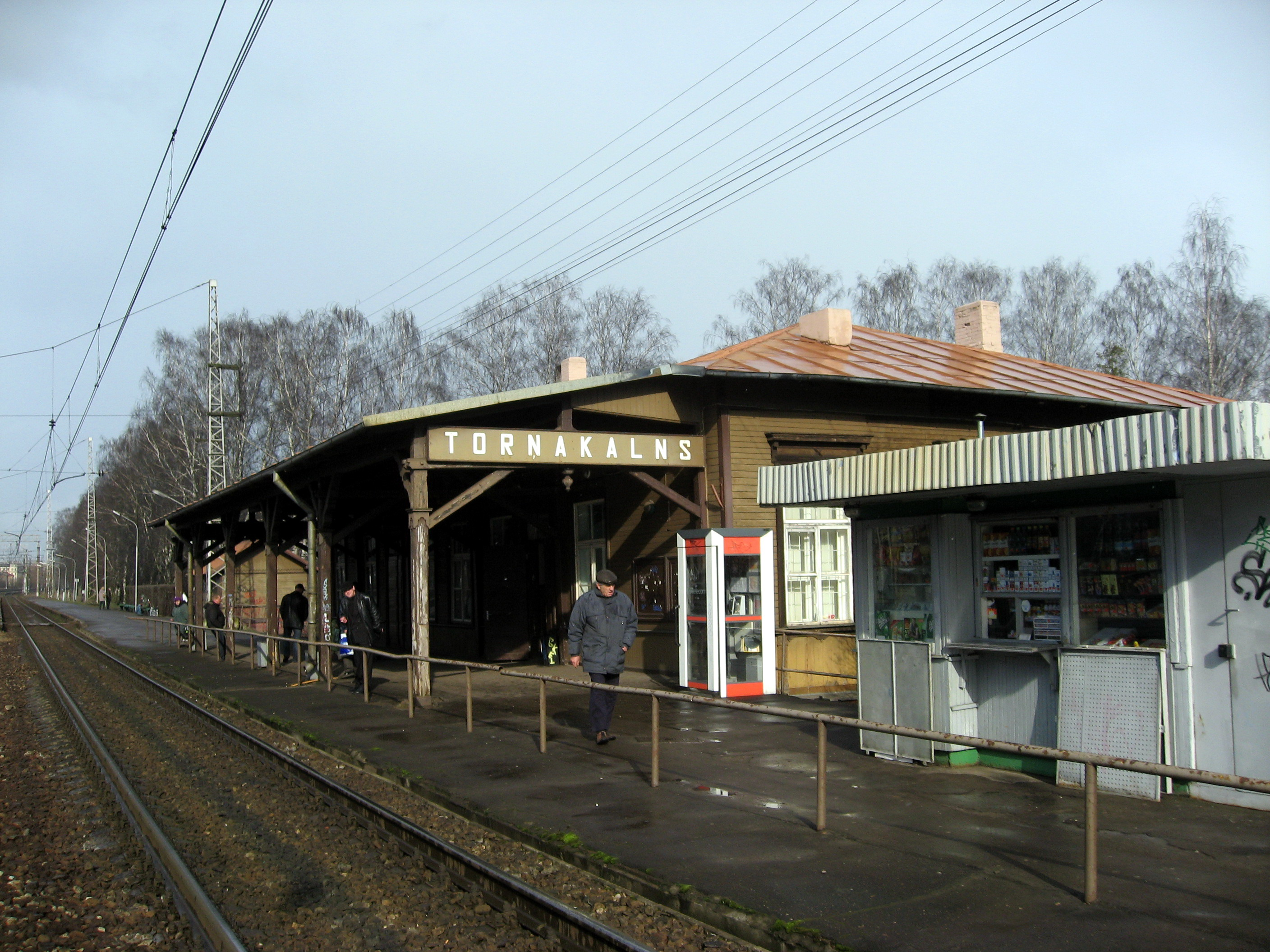
Torņakalns Railway Station

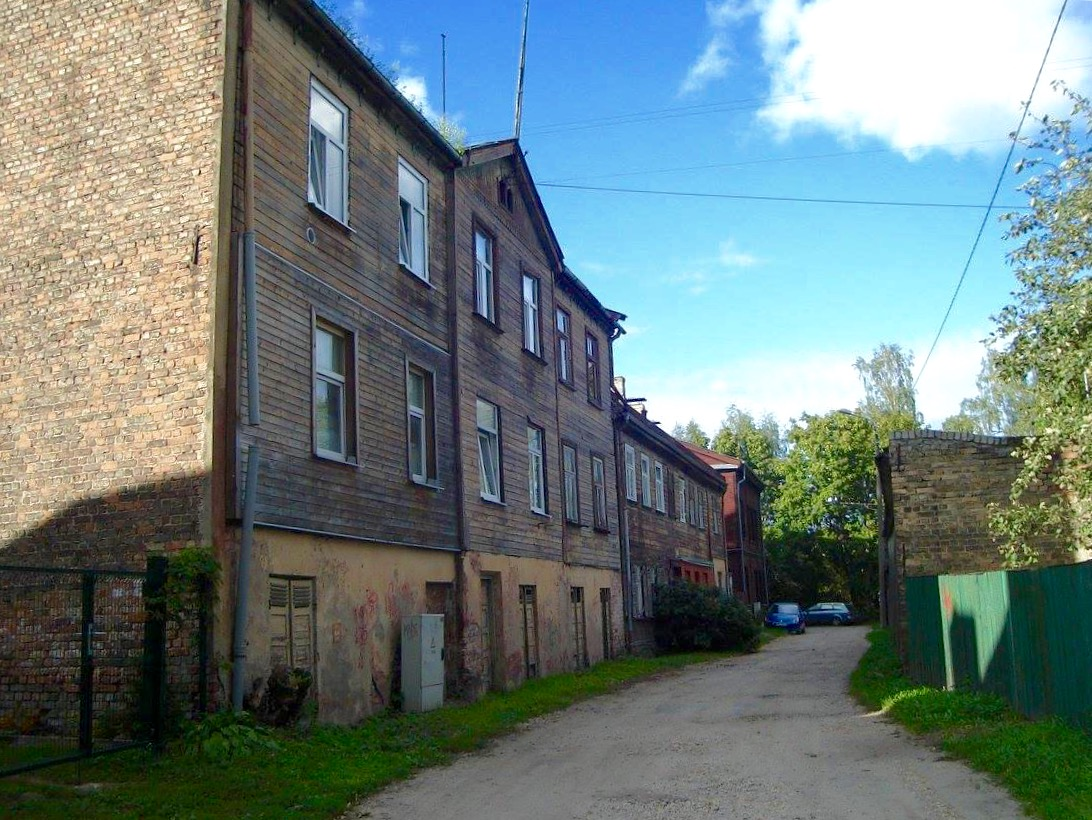
Konrāda Street in Torņakalns

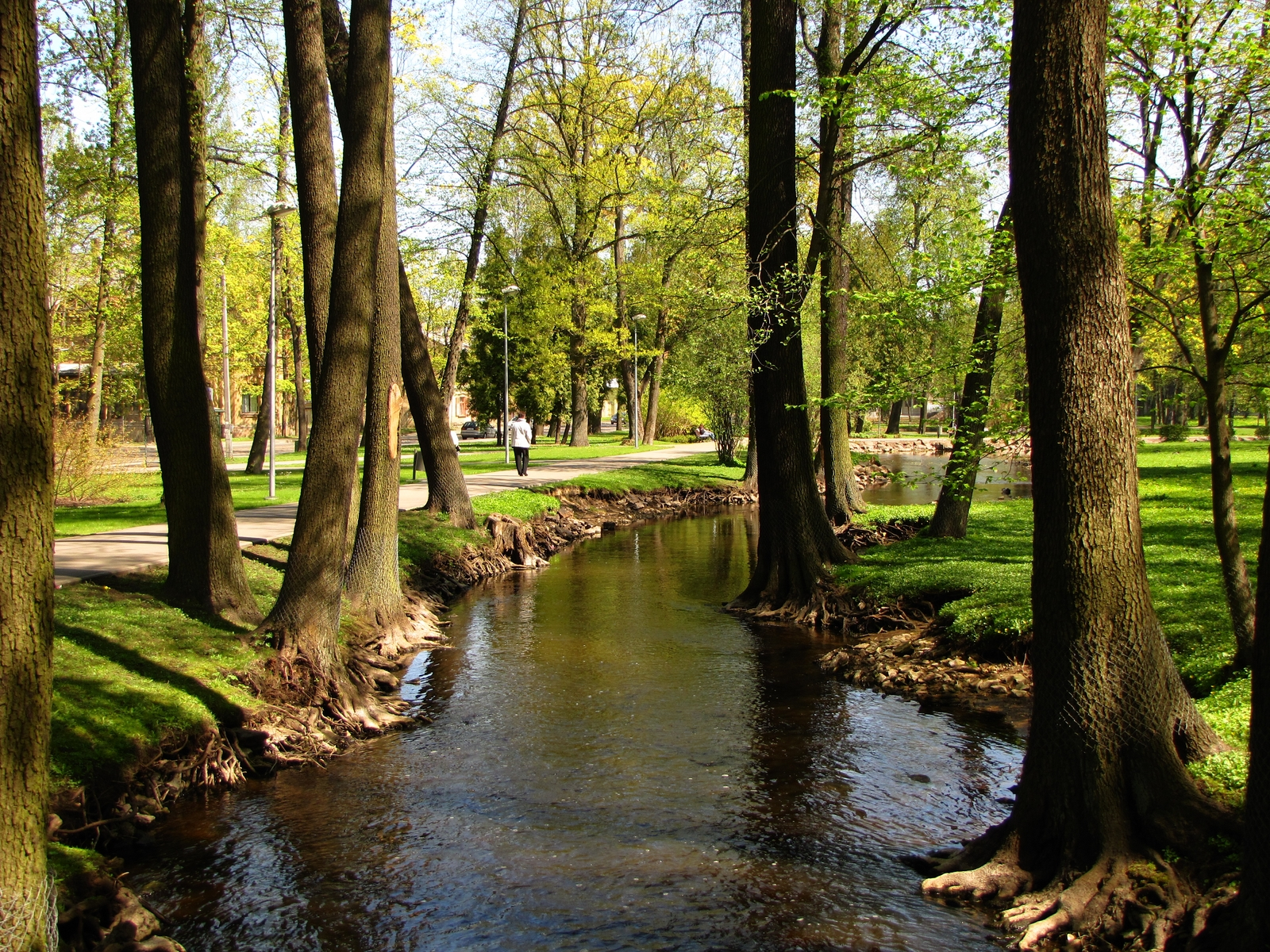
Arkādija Park

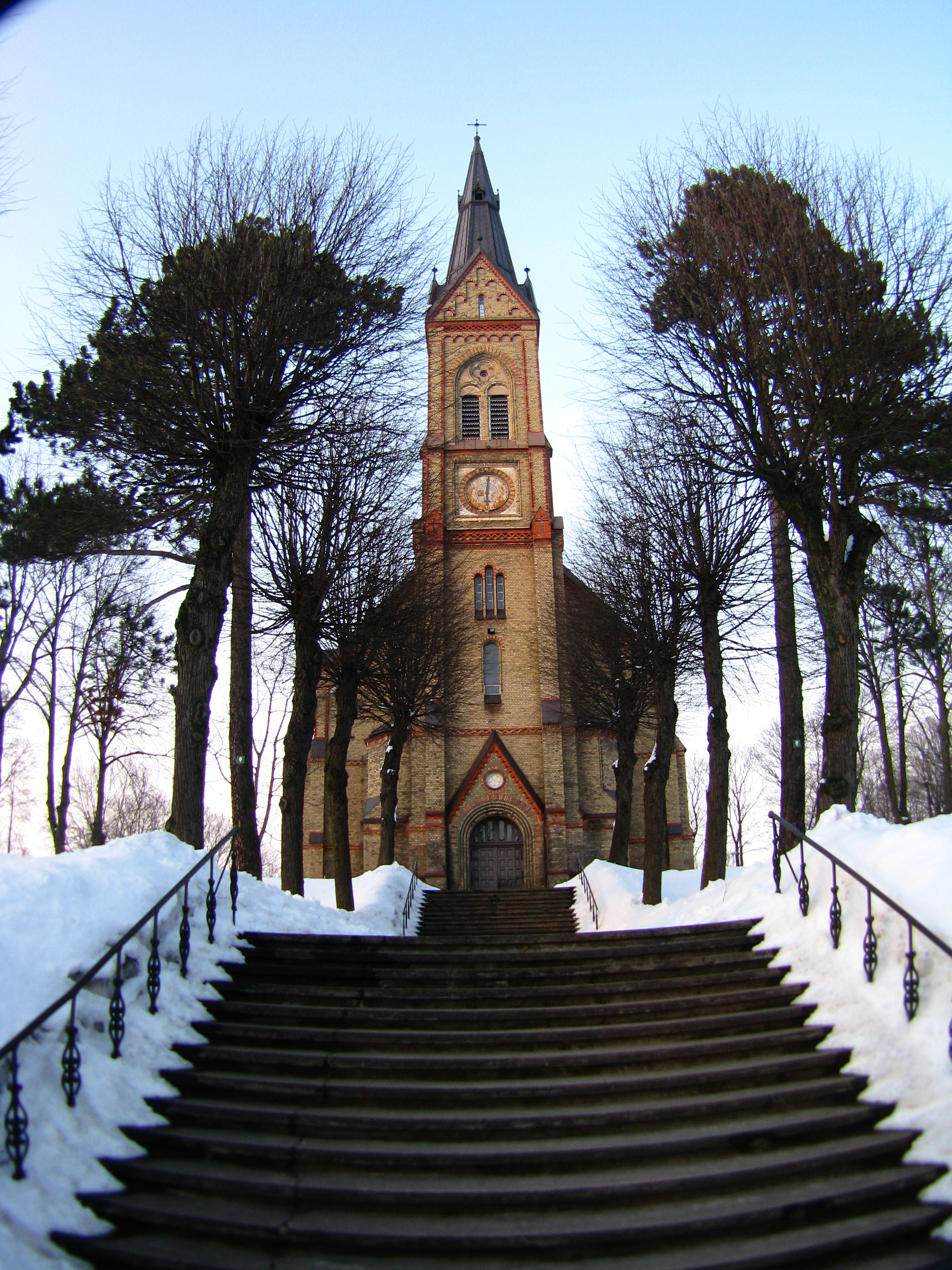
Church of Luther in Torņakalns.

National Library of Latvia
