= Ērgļi Parish =

Parish of Latvia

- parish of Latvia
- Coat of arms

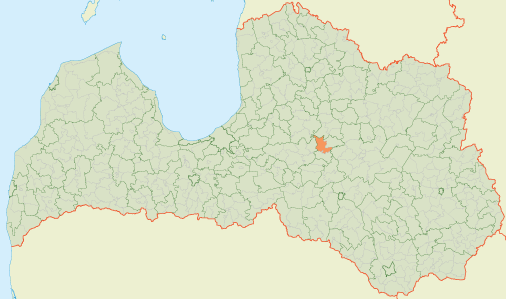
- 56°55′09″N 25°36′28″E
- Country: Latvia

Area
  - Total: 131.84 km^{2} (50.90 sq mi)
  - Land: 128.52 km^{2} (49.62 sq mi)
  - Water: 3.32 km^{2} (1.28 sq mi)

Population (1 January 2024)
  - Total: 1,827
  - Density: 14/km^{2} (36/sq mi)

Ērgļi Parish (Latvian: Ērgļu pagasts) is an administrative unit of Madona Municipality in the Vidzeme region of Latvia. At the beginning of 2014, the population of the parish was 2421. The administrative center is Ērgļi village.

== Towns, villages and settlements of Ērgļi Parish ==
- Ērgļi
- Katrīna
