= Ērgļi =

Town in Latvia

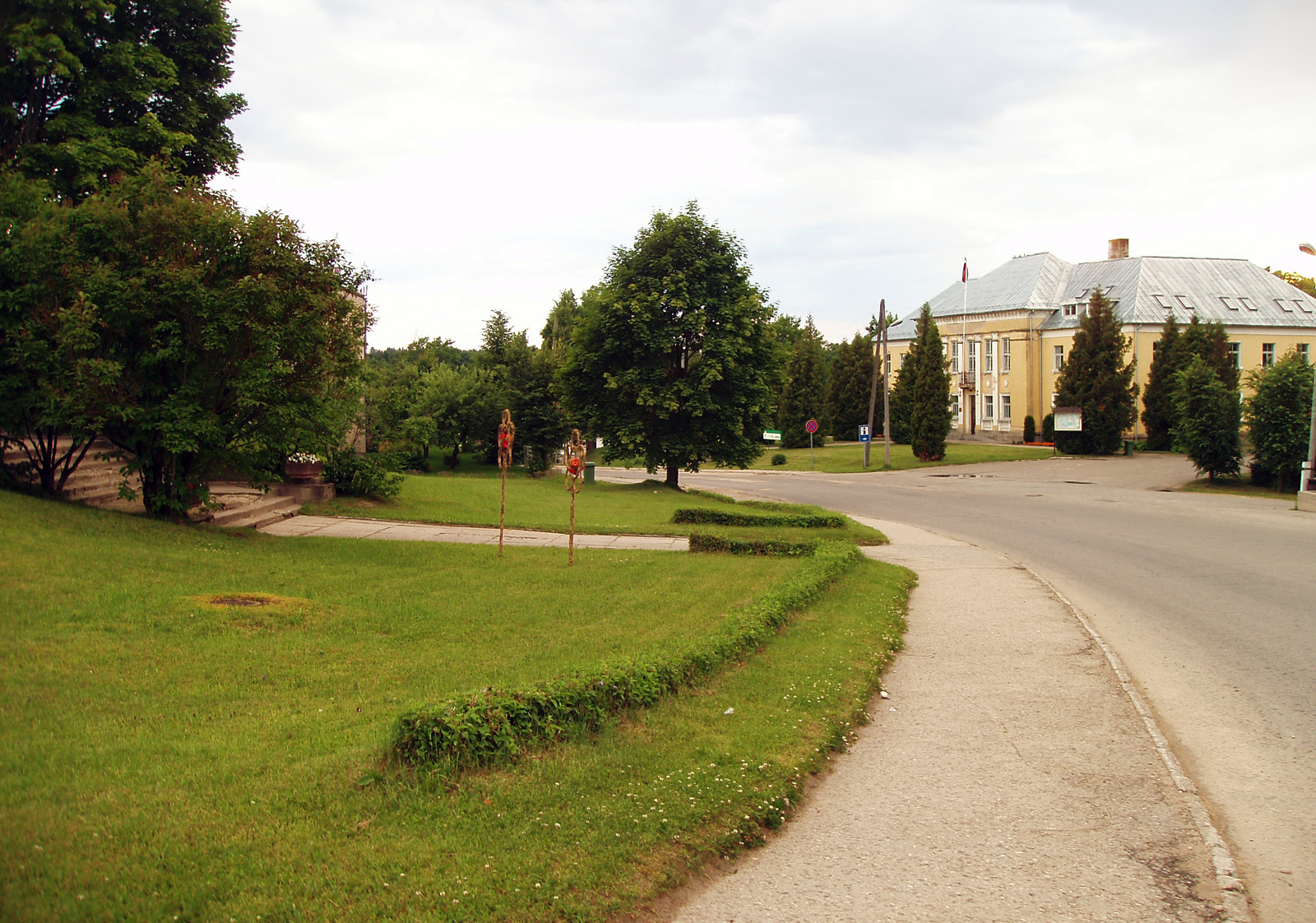
Street of Ergli village in 2005

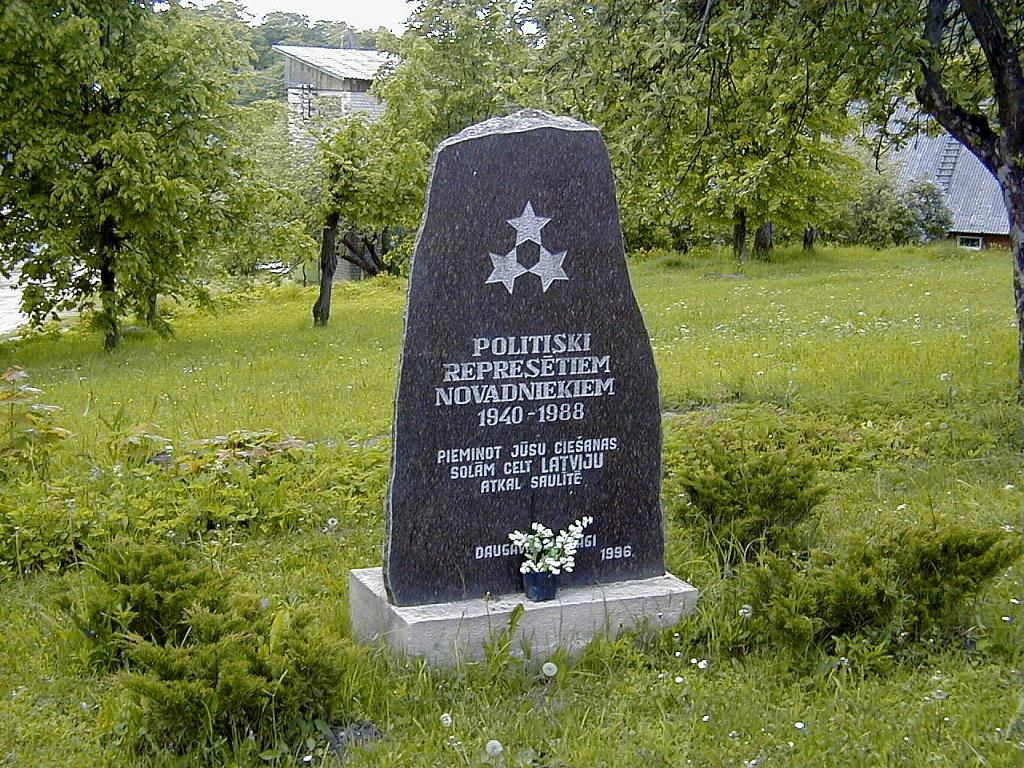
Memorial of victims of political repression during the Soviet occupation in Ērgļi

Ērgļi is a small town in the Ērgļi Parish of Madona Municipality in the Vidzeme region of Latvia on the banks of the Ogre river. It serves as the administrative center for Ērgļi Parish. Ērgļi had 2,769 residents as of 2017.

== History ==
Ērgļi castle, on the Ogre river, was one of the largest castles of Latgale. From 1211, the area belonged to the Order of the Brothers of the Sword and later to the Archdiocese of Riga. The first written mention of a castle was in 1334. After the Livonian War, the area fell to Poland-Lithuania, then to Sweden, and to Russia in 1721.

The village was built around the estate Erlaa; in 1931, it had 331 inhabitants. It was in the combat zone during the Second World War, and was completely destroyed. In the postwar period, the place grew by settlement of industry.

Until 2009, the town was the terminus of the Riga-Ērgļi railway. Until October 2007, railway service was provided nine times a week, leaving daily at about 3.40, and on rest days also leaving at about 13.00.

== Twin towns ==
- Kölln-Reisiek, Germany
