= Atgāzene =

Neighbourhood of Riga, Latvia

- Neighbourhood
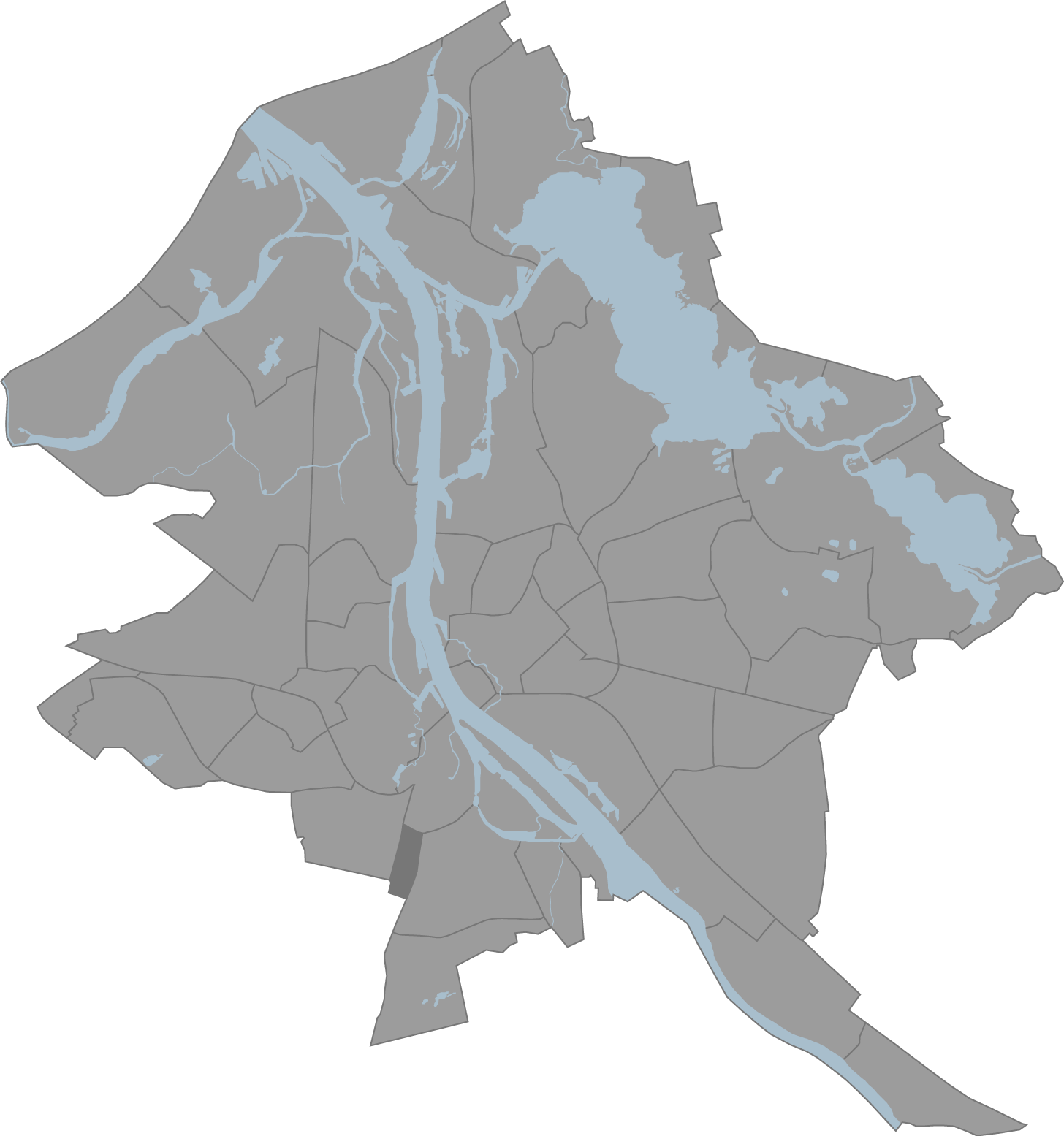
- Location of Atgāzene in Riga
- Country: Latvia
- City: Riga
- District: Zemgale Suburb

Area
  - Total: 0.745 km^{2} (0.288 sq mi)

Population (2019)
  - Total: 1,649
  - Density: 2,210/km^{2} (5,730/sq mi)
- Website: apkaimes.lv

Atgāzene is a neighbourhood of Riga, the capital of Latvia. It is the location of Turība University.
