= Daugava =

River in Europe

Daugava Western Dvina
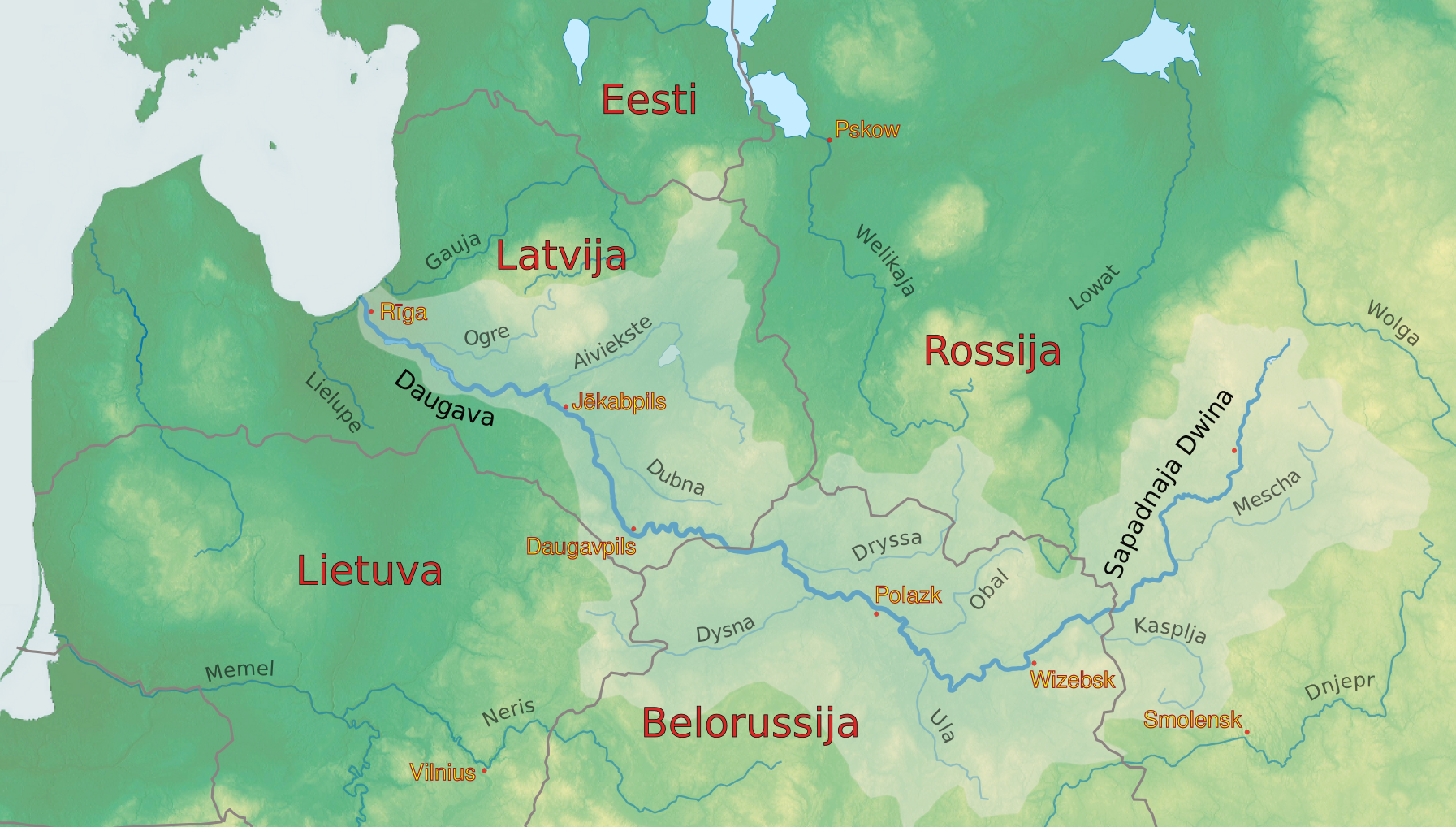
- The drainage basin of the Daugava
- Native name: Западная Двина (Russian); Дзвіна (Belarusian); Daugava (Latvian); Vēna (Livonian); Dauguva (Lithuanian); Väina (Estonian); Düna (German); Dźwina (Polish)

Location
- Country: Belarus, Latvia, Russia
- Cities: Vitebsk; Polotsk; Daugavpils; Riga

Physical characteristics
- Source: Valdai Hills
  - location: Penovsky District, Tver Oblast, Russia
  - coordinates: 56°52′16″N 32°31′44″E
  - elevation: 221 m (725 ft)
- Mouth: Gulf of Riga
  - location: Riga, Latvia
  - coordinates: 57°3′42″N 24°1′50″E
  - elevation: 0 m (0 ft)
- Length: 1,020 km (630 mi)
- Basin size: 87,900 km^{2} (33,900 sq mi)
- Discharge
  - average: 678 m^{3}/s (23,900 cu ft/s)

The Daugava (/ˈdaʊɡəvə/ DOW-gə-və), (Note: Latvian: Daugava [ˈdˠaʊɡɐvˠɐ]; Latgalian: Daugova; Polish: Dźwina [ˈd͡ʑvina]; German: Düna [ˈdyːna] (from Latin Duna)) also known as the Western Dvina (Note: Russian: Западная Двина, romanized: Západnaya Dviná; Belarusian: Заходняя Дзвіна, romanized: Zachodniaja Dźvina) or the Väina River, (Note: Estonian: Väina jõgi; Finnish: Väinäjoki) is a large river rising in the Valdai Hills of Russia that flows through Belarus and Latvia into the Gulf of Riga of the Baltic Sea. The Daugava rises close to the source of the Volga. It is 1,020 km (630 mi) in length, of which 352 km (219 mi) are in Latvia and 325 km (202 mi) in Russia. It is a westward-flowing river, tracing out a great south-bending curve as it passes through northern Belarus.

Latvia's capital, Riga, bridges the river's estuary four times. Built on both riverbanks, the city centre is 15 kilometres (9.3 mi) from the river's mouth and is a significant port.

== Etymology ==
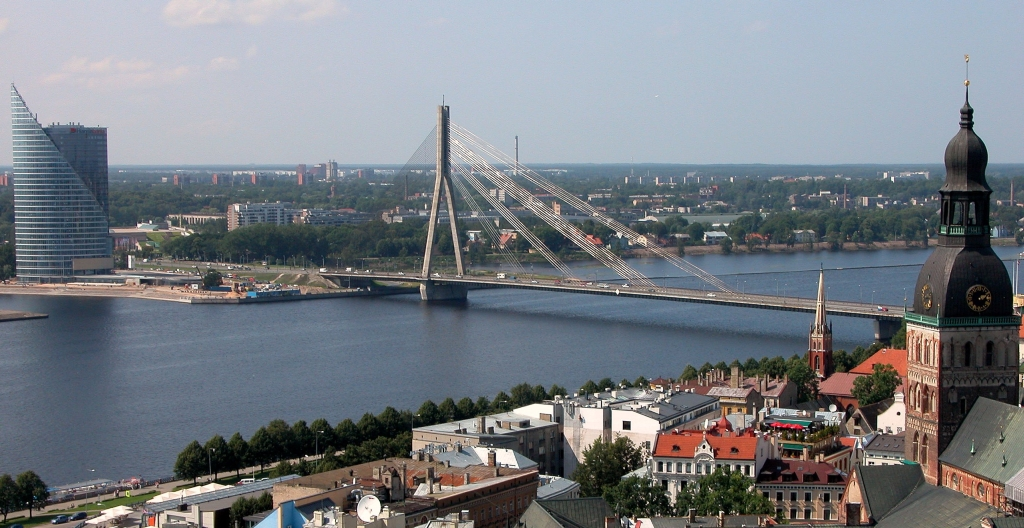
The Daugava flows through Riga in Latvia

According to Max Vasmer's Etymological Dictionary, the toponym Dvina cannot stem from a Uralic language; instead, it possibly comes from an Indo-European word which used to mean 'river' or 'stream'. The name Dvina strongly resembles Danuvius which is itself derived from the Proto-Indo-European *dānu, meaning 'large river'.

The Finno-Ugric names Vēna (Livonian), Väina or Väinajõgi (Estonian), and Väinäjoki (Finnish) all stem from Proto-Finnic *väin, which roughly translates to 'a large, peacefully rolling river'.

== Geography ==
The total catchment area of the river is 87,900 km^{2} (33,900 mi^{2}), of which 33,150 km^{2} (12,800 mi^{2}) are in Belarus.

=== Tributaries ===
The following rivers are tributaries to the river Daugava (from source to mouth):

- Left: Mezha, Kasplya, Dysna, Laucesa, Berezauka, Eglona, Pikstere, Ņega
- Right: Usvyacha, Palata, Drysa, Dubna, Aiviekste, Pērse, Dīvaja, Ogre

== History ==
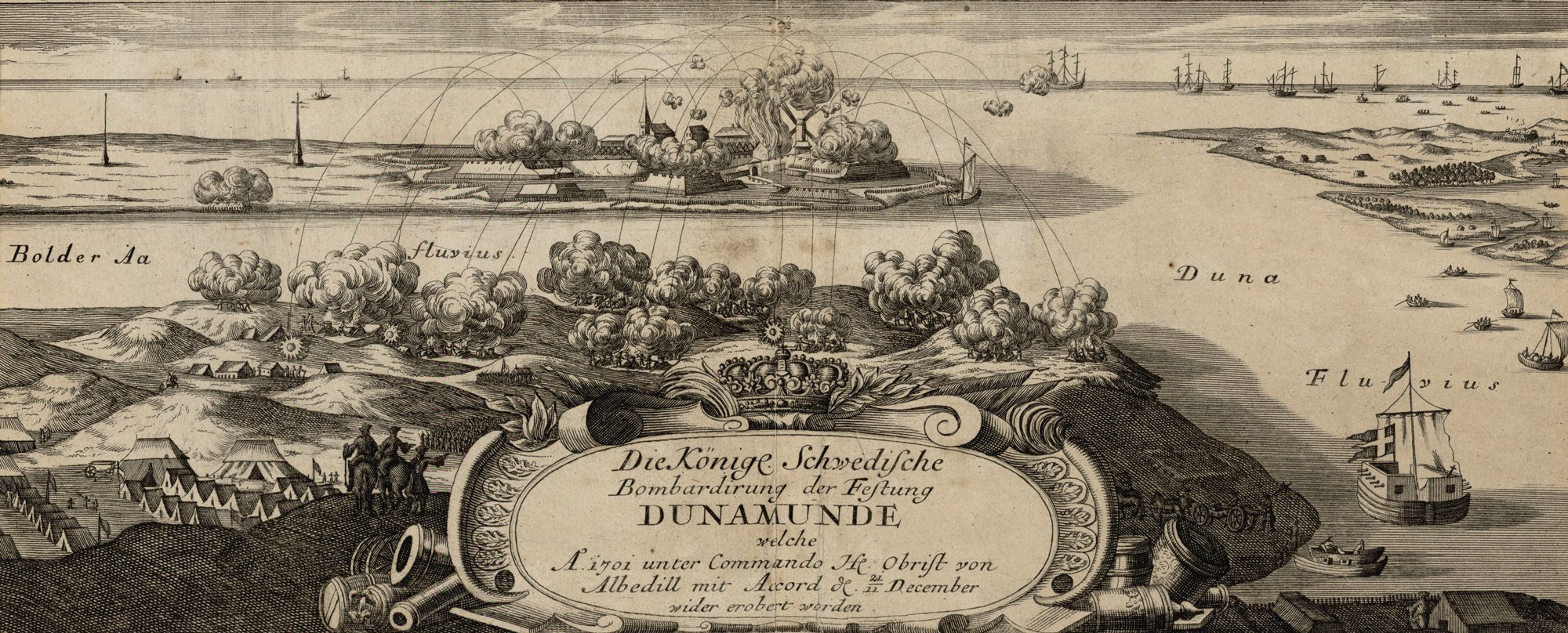
The Swedish army bombarding the fortress of Dünamünde at the Daugava's estuary in Latvia

Humans have settled at the mouth of the Daugava and along the shores of the Gulf of Riga for millennia, initially participating in a hunter-gatherer economy and utilizing the waters of the Daugava estuary for fishing and gathering. Beginning around the sixth century CE, Viking explorers crossed the Baltic Sea and entered the Daugava River, navigating upriver into the Baltic interior.

In medieval times, the Daugava was part of the trade route from the Varangians to the Greeks, an important route for the transport of furs from the north and of Byzantine silver from the south. The Riga area, inhabited by the Finnic-speaking Livs, became a key location of settlement and defence of the mouth of the Daugava at least as early as the Middle Ages, as evidenced by the now destroyed fort at Torņakalns on the west bank of the Daugava in present-day Riga.

From the end of the Livonian War great part of the Daugava formed the northeastern border of Duchy of Courland and Semigallia separating it initially from the Kingdom of Livonia, later Swedish Livonia and Riga Governorate. After the incorporation later in the Russian Empire the river formed a border between governorates of Courland on the western bank and Livonia and Vitebsk on the eastern bank.

From 1936 to 1939 Ķegums Hydroelectric Power Station was built on the Daugava river in Latvia. Pļaviņas Hydroelectric Power Station was put into operation in 1968 and Riga Hydroelectric Power Plant in 1974.

== Settlements ==
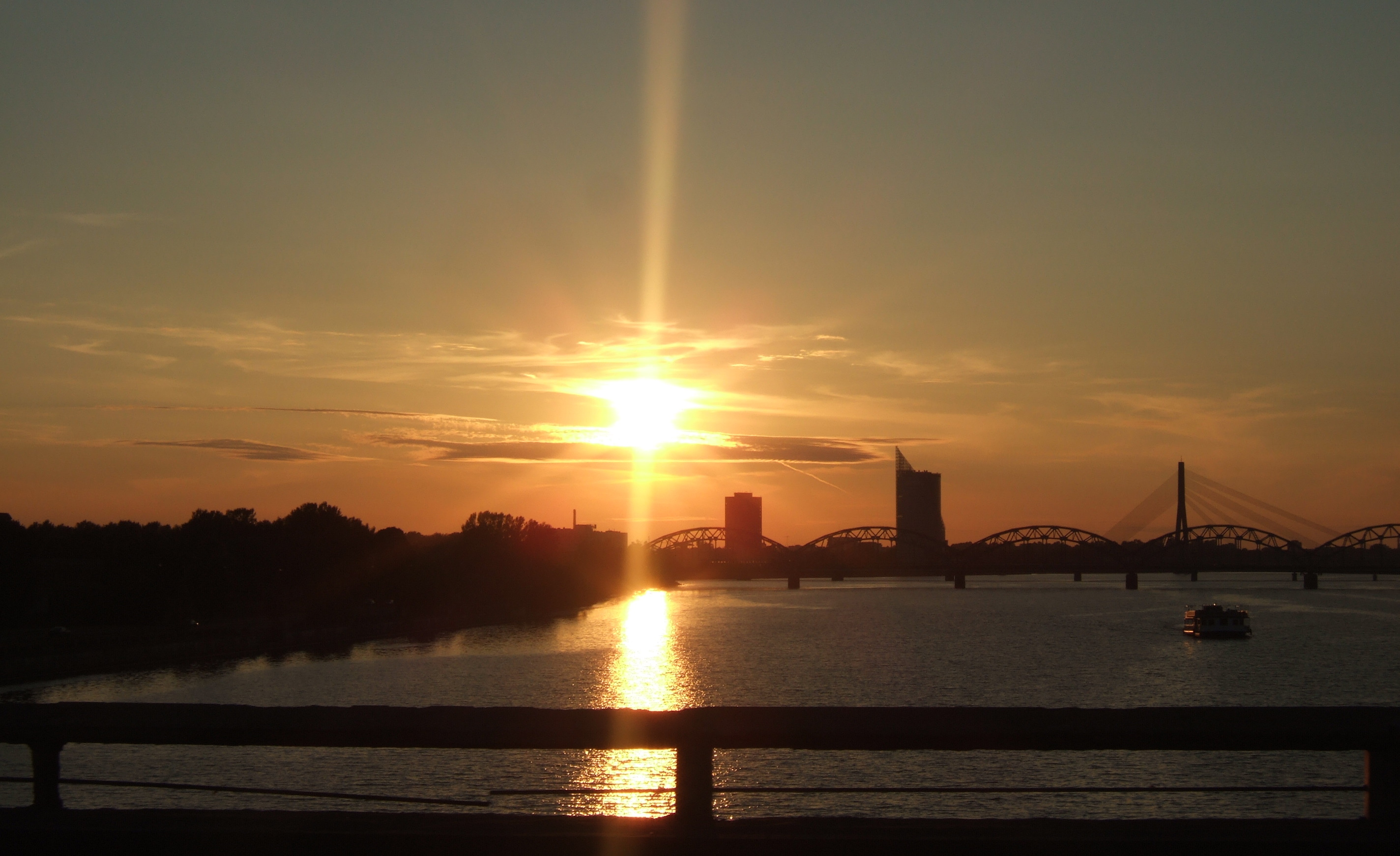
Daugava sunset in Riga

The following are some of the cities and towns built along the Daugava:

=== Russia ===
- Andreapol
- Zapadnaya Dvina
- Velizh

=== Belarus ===
- Ruba
- Vitebsk
- Beshankovichy
- Polotsk (home to the Boris stones)
- Navapolatsk
- Dzisna
- Verkhnedvinsk
- Druya

=== Latvia ===
- Krāslava
- Daugavpils
- Līvāni
- Jēkabpils
- Pļaviņas
- Aizkraukle
- Jaunjelgava
- Lielvārde
- Ķegums
- Ogre
- Ikšķile
- Salaspils
- Riga

== Environment ==
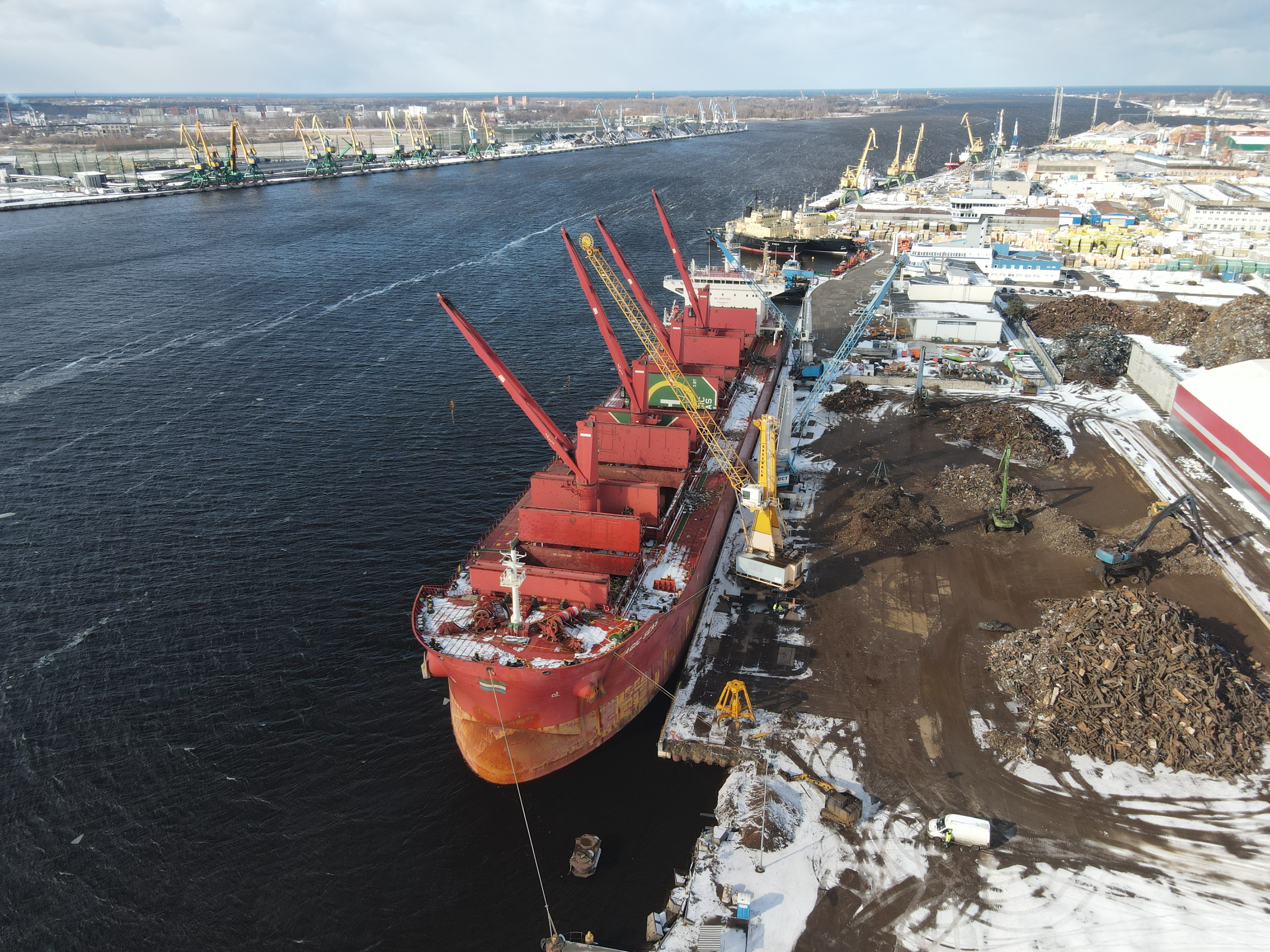
Port of Riga on the Daugava

The river began experiencing environmental deterioration in the Soviet era due to collective agriculture (producing considerable adverse water pollution runoff) and hydroelectric power projects. This is the river that the Vula river flows into.

=== Water quality ===
Upstream of the Latvian town of Jekabpils, the river's pH has a characteristic value of about 7.8 (slight alkaline). In this area, the concentration of ionic calcium is around 43 milligrams per liter, nitrate is about 0.82 milligrams per liter, ionic phosphate is 0.038 milligrams per liter, and oxygen saturation is 80%. The high nitrate and phosphate load of the Daugava has contributed to the extensive buildup of phytoplankton biomass in the Baltic Sea; the Oder and Vistula rivers also contribute to the high nutrient loading of the Baltic.

In Belarus, water pollution of the Daugava is considered moderately severe, with the chief sources being treated wastewater, fish-farming, and agricultural chemical runoff (such as herbicides, pesticides, nitrates, and phosphates).
