= Sausnēja Parish =

Parish of Latvia

- parish of Latvia
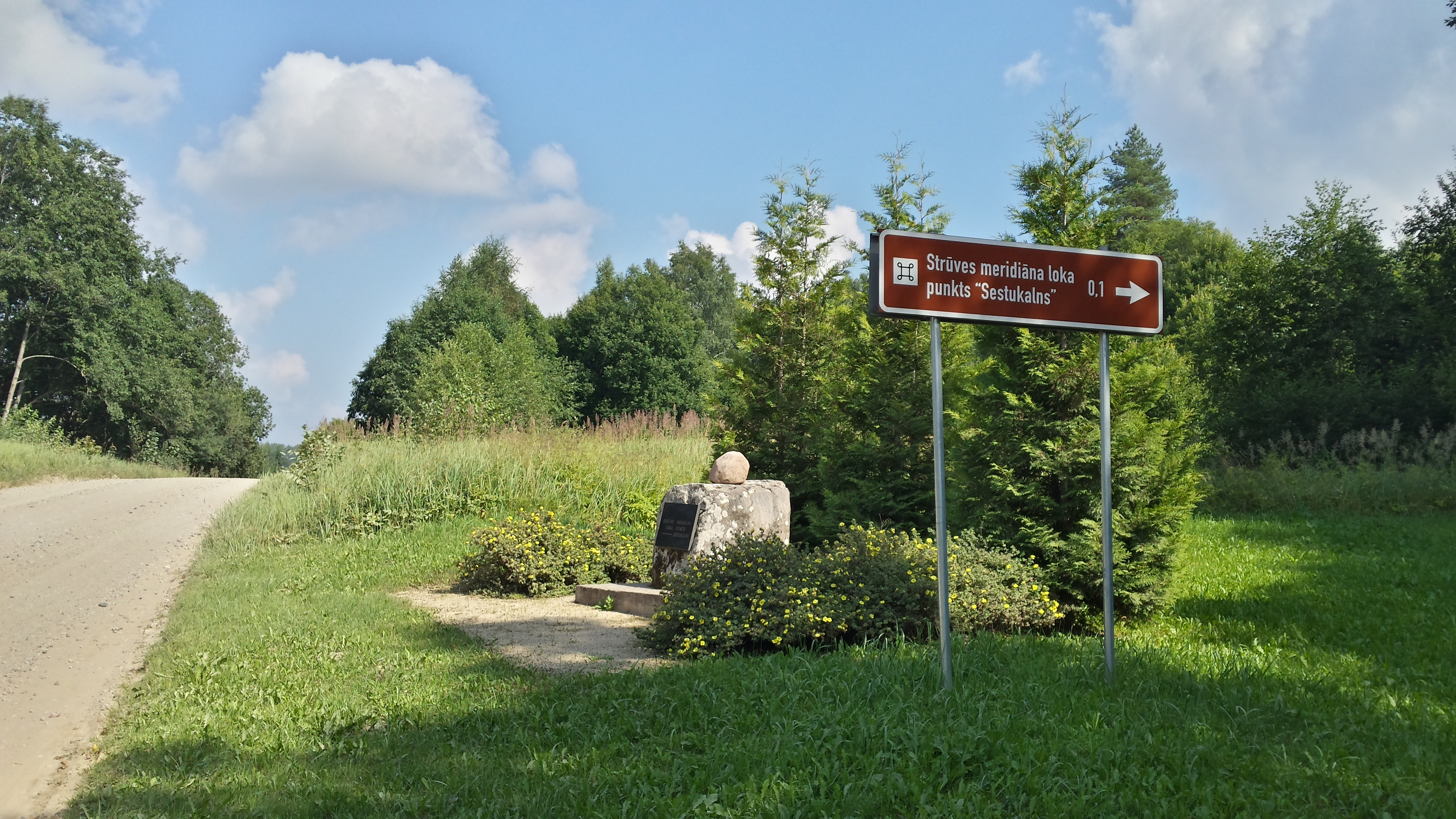

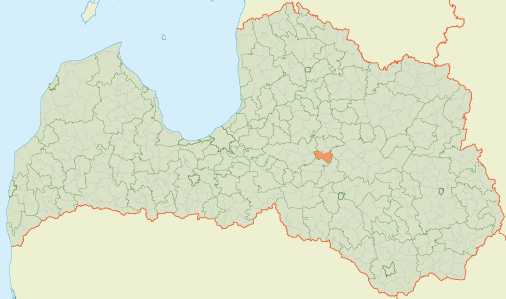
- 56°49′46″N 25°37′54″E
- Country: Latvia

Area
  - Total: 114.36 km^{2} (44.15 sq mi)
  - Land: 114.36 km^{2} (44.15 sq mi)
  - Water: 2.64 km^{2} (1.02 sq mi)

Population (1 January 2024)
  - Total: 397
  - Density: 3.5/km^{2} (9.0/sq mi)

Sausnēja Parish (Latvian: Sausnējas pagasts) is an administrative unit of Madona Municipality in the Vidzeme region of Latvia. At the beginning of 2014, the population of the parish was 622. The administrative center is Sidrabiņi village.

== Towns, villages and settlements of Sausnēja parish ==
- Liepkalne
- Sausnēja
- Sidrabiņi
