= Sami (chimpanzee) =

Chimpanzee exhibited at the Belgrade Zoo

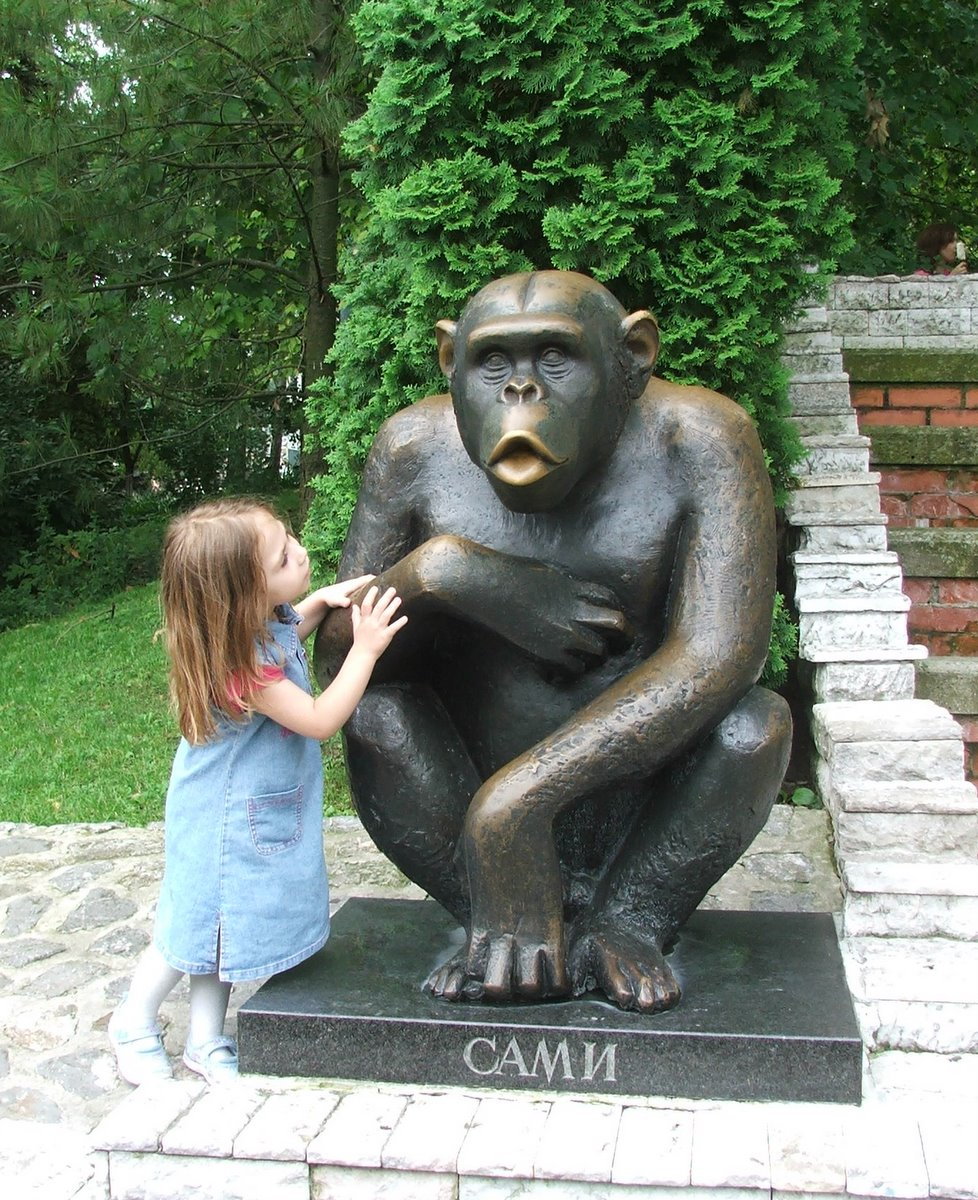
- Statue of Sami at the Belgrade Zoo
- Other name: Serbian Cyrillic: Сами
- Species: chimpanzee
- Sex: male
- Born: 1979; Osijek Zoo and Aquarium, Osijek, Croatia
- Died: September 11, 1992
- Resting place: Belgrade Zoo
- Known for: escaping the Belgrade Zoo twice
- Residence: Belgrade Zoo
- Offspring: Zorica

Sami (Serbian Cyrillic: Сами; 1979 – 11 September 1992) was a chimpanzee who was kept at the Belgrade Zoo between January 1988 and September 1992. Sami managed to escape from his enclosure twice within the span of several days in February 1988; he was recaptured both times.

During his first escape attempt, Sami headed for the Balkan Cinema in downtown Belgrade and then to Kalemegdan Park. Before he could reach Kalemegdan Park, Sami was cornered at Students Square. He was eventually convinced to return to his enclosure by zoo director Vuk Bojović, who took Sami by the hand and drove him back to the zoo in his car. Sami's second escape attempt, which occurred two days later, was the subject of intense media scrutiny. Over 4,000 Belgraders gathered outside the courtyard where Sami had been cornered and held up placards imploring Sami not to give himself up. Sami was eventually shot with a tranquilizer dart and taken back to the zoo.

The publicity sparked by Sami's two escape attempts prompted calls for infrastructure improvements to the Belgrade Zoo, leading to the construction of a new gate and several new enclosures. Sami died of natural causes in 1992 and was buried at the lawn next to the zoo's entrance. Four years later, a bronze statue of the chimpanzee was unveiled at the zoo.

== Life ==
Sami was born at the Osijek Zoo and Aquarium, in Osijek (modern-day Croatia), in 1979. He had a female offspring named Zorica. He was a well developed specimen with a thick coat. Sami arrived at the Belgrade Zoo on 12 January 1988. Upon his arrival, he was placed in a cramped, dilapidated enclosure with a reinforced grid which was nominally capable of containing an adult chimpanzee. Unaccustomed to his new surroundings, Sami exhibited an aggressive disposition during his first few weeks at the zoo.

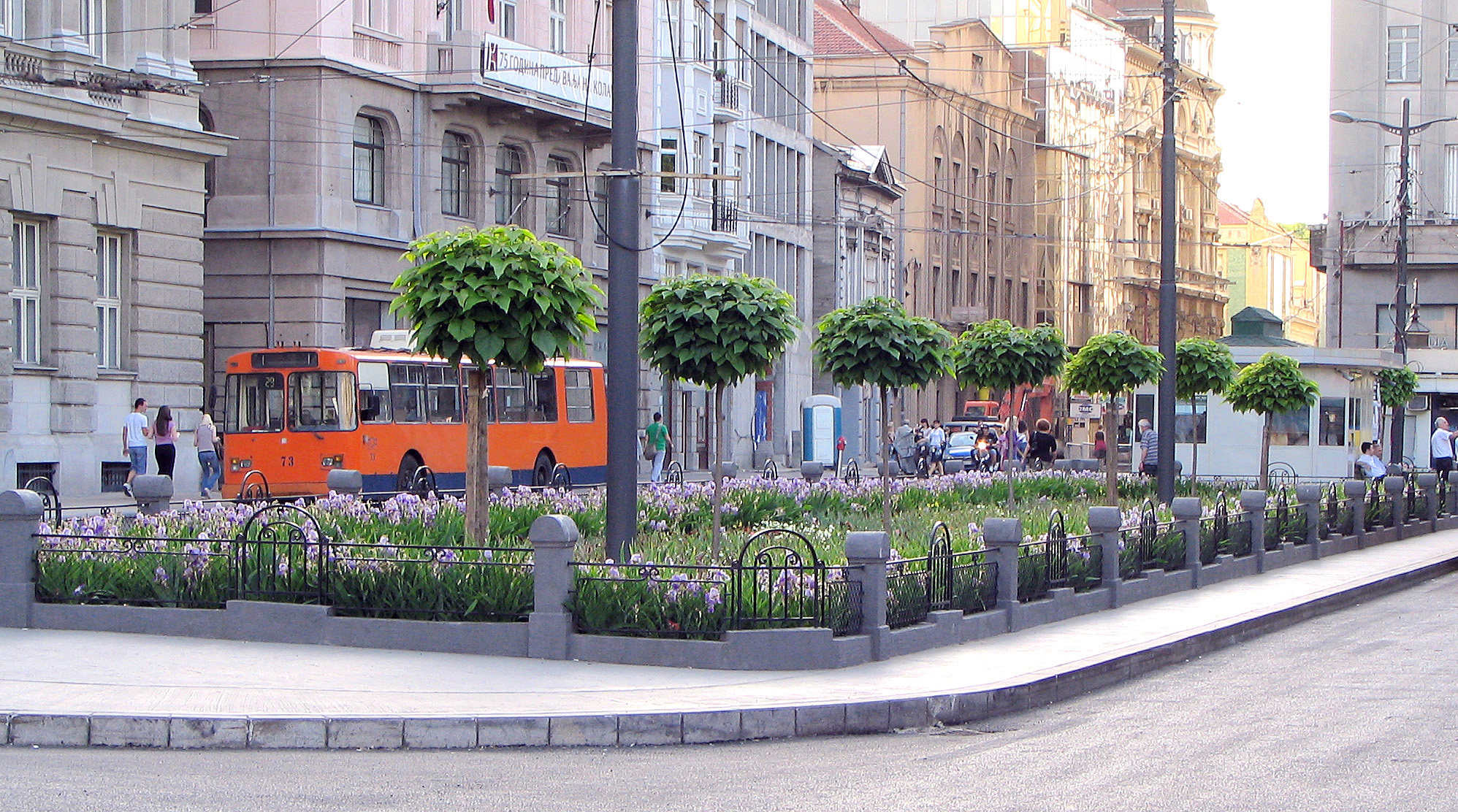
Students Square

Sami made his first escape attempt around 8:00 p.m. on Sunday, 21 February 1988. Contemporary news reports indicated that he was likely searching for a mate. At the time, a single chimpanzee cost around $10,000 ($22,815 in 2026), and zoo officials stated they could not afford to buy Sami a companion. Sami first headed east, towards the Dorćol neighbourhood, and then south towards downtown Belgrade. He was spotted in front of the JNA Hall and then appeared outside the Balkan Cinema, causing widespread panic among the passersby, before heading towards the Terazije Tunnel, cautiously pursued by around a dozen police vehicles. The police blocked the entrance to the tunnel with their vehicles and managed to prevent Sami from entering it. Instead, Sami headed towards Kalemegdan Park. Around 9:00 p.m., Sami was cornered at Students Square, where he was approached by the one person he trusted, zoo director Vuk Bojović, who attempted to persuade Sami to accompany him back to his enclosure, saying: "Come on, Sami. Let's go home." Bojović eventually managed to take Sami by the hand and drove him back to the zoo in his car.

At 10:00 a.m. on Tuesday, 23 February 1988, Sami managed to escape once more, breaking out of his cage and entering the zoo's cafeteria, where several staff members were having breakfast. Upon seeing Sami, the zoo employees panicked, and several attempted to escape through a window. Puzzled, Sami left the cafeteria, only to encounter the same zoo employees outside, who then attempted to climb back into the cafeteria through the same window. Sami made his way outside the zoo and soon appeared at the nearby Beko Factory. Some of the factory workers attempted to ensnare Sami with a large net, but were unsuccessful. Sami then headed directly into city traffic, rocking a streetcar with passengers inside. As he was rocking the streetcar, the factory workers – who had followed Sami – managed to ensnare him with the net, but he quickly disentangled himself. The factory workers then chased Sami to a courtyard at 33 Tsar Dušan Street, where he climbed atop a cherry tree and eventually a garage.

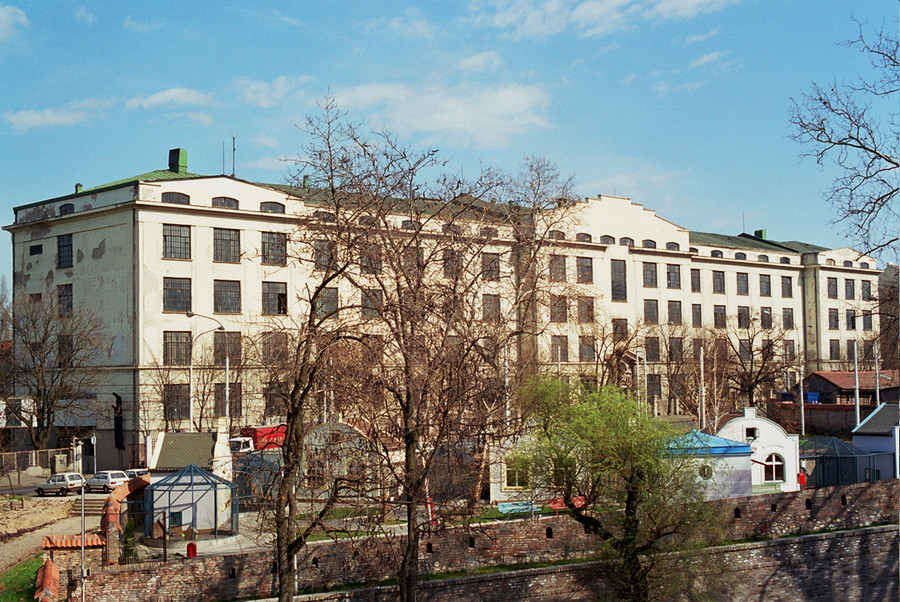
Workers from the Beko Factory attempted to ensnare Sami with a net

Word quickly spread of Sami's second escape. Over 4,000 Belgraders gathered to watch Sami on the roof of the garage. Reporters quickly arrived on the scene, offering minute-by-minute televised coverage of the event. Many of the onlookers did not wish to see Sami apprehended and cheered him on instead. Some held up placards with slogans such as "Sami, we're with you!" and "Don't give yourself up, Sami!" Bojović climbed atop the garage and attempted to persuade Sami to return to the zoo with him, this time unsuccessfully. Since the Belgrade Zoo was not equipped with a tranquilizer gun at the time, the police had to wait for one to be delivered from the Osijek Zoo before they could attempt to rein Sami in. Around 5:00 p.m., with temperatures nearing 0 °C (32 °F), Sami was shot with a tranquilizer dart and recaptured.

Sami died unexpectedly on 11 September 1992. A subsequent dissection of Sami's cadaver revealed that he had been suffering from an inflammation of the intestines. Sami's remains were buried at the lawn adjacent to the zoo's entrance.

== Legacy ==
Following his death, several of Belgrade's leading newspapers sardonically eulogized Sami as a "dissident". Many Yugoslavs identified with Sami's predicament, equating Sami's captivity with their own plight under communism. The scholar Ron Broglio writes:

Sami's escape invoked fellow feeling among humans who identified with his confinement. His escape became a momentary rupture in the social fabric. The animal was not complying with its prescribed place in the social system, and this line of flight ignited desires just below the surface of Belgrade's citizens. Had Sami been a human, those who aligned with him could have faced arrest, but as a liminal figure on the edge of the social circle, as an animal, Sami could be cheered by the crowd with impunity. In cathartic voices and presence, they connected their concerns with his. The biopolitics that confined the chimp to a realm outside the human in turn aided the humans confined within Yugoslavian communism. Together with Sami, the people of Belgrade could imagine that another world was possible. Humans and chimp together, for a moment, levelled the geopolitical ecology.

Sami remains the Belgrade Zoo's most famous simian. Bojović exploited the publicity surrounding Sami's escape attempts to underscore the need for further investment in the zoo, which led to the construction of a new gate and several new enclosures. In 1996, a bronze statue of Sami was erected near the spot where he was buried, next to the zoo's new and improved chimpanzee enclosure.

Sami is alluded to in Emir Kusturica's award-winning 1995 film Underground, which features a chimpanzee named Soni, who survives the German bombing of the Belgrade Zoo during the Axis invasion of Yugoslavia in April 1941. Sami's escape attempts also served as the inspiration for the Macedonian filmmaker Vladimir Blaževski's 2018 film Year of the Monkey.

== See also ==
- Gabi (dog)
- Muja (alligator)
- List of individual apes
