= Gabi (dog) =

Belgrade Zoo guard dog

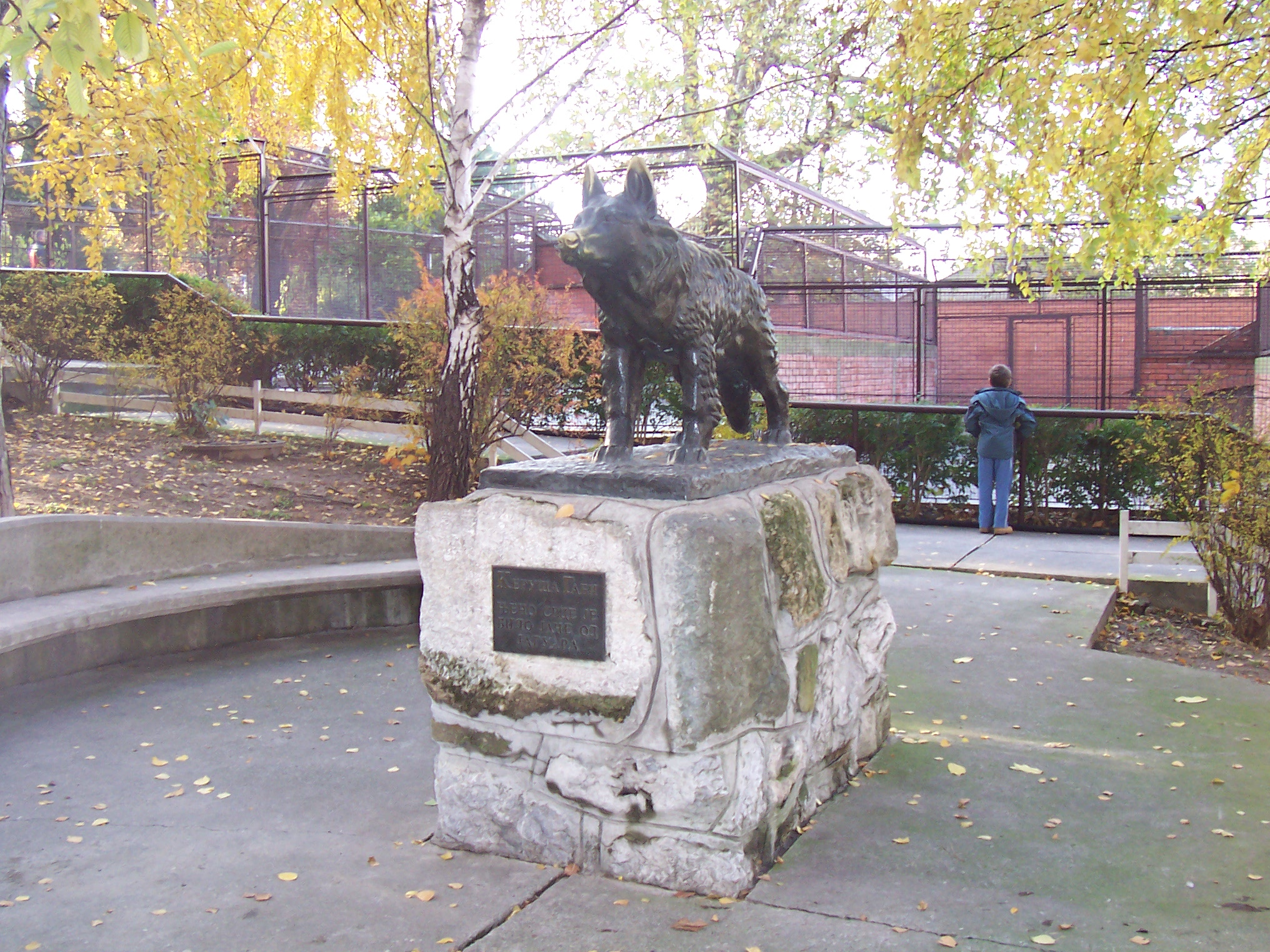
- Monument to Gabi in the zoo
- Breed: German Shepherd
- Awards: A statue was erected in her honor at the zoo

Gabi (Serbian Cyrillic: Габи) was a female German Shepherd who worked as a guard dog in the Belgrade Zoo, SR Serbia, SFR Yugoslavia. She became famous when she was attacked by a jaguar that escaped from its cage on 22 June 1987.

== History ==
In the 1980s an eight-year-old German Shepherd, Gabi, was adopted by the zoo and became an informal security guard. On the night of 22 June 1987, she was patrolling the zoo with guard Stanimir Stanić and a male German shepherd. In the darkness Stanić failed to notice a jaguar that had escaped from its cage. Gabi sensed the animal and jumped on it, while the other dog ran in fear from the large cat.

Gabi fought the jaguar throughout the zoo, which allowed critical time for Stanić to telephone the police and wait for them to arrive. Gabi's actions prevented the jaguar's escape from the zoo and saved Stanimir Stanić from a possible attack. The police tried unsuccessfully to recapture the jaguar, and were eventually forced to shoot it to protect the public.

Gabi was operated on at the Faculty of Veterinary Science at the University of Belgrade and nursed back to health by the zoo's director Vuk Bojović. She eventually fully recovered and continued working as a guard dog.

Later, the zoo erected a monument to Gabi with the inscription: "Dog Gabi, her heart was stronger than a jaguar".

== See also ==
- Muja (alligator)
- Sami (chimpanzee)
- List of individual dogs
