= Belgrade Zoo =

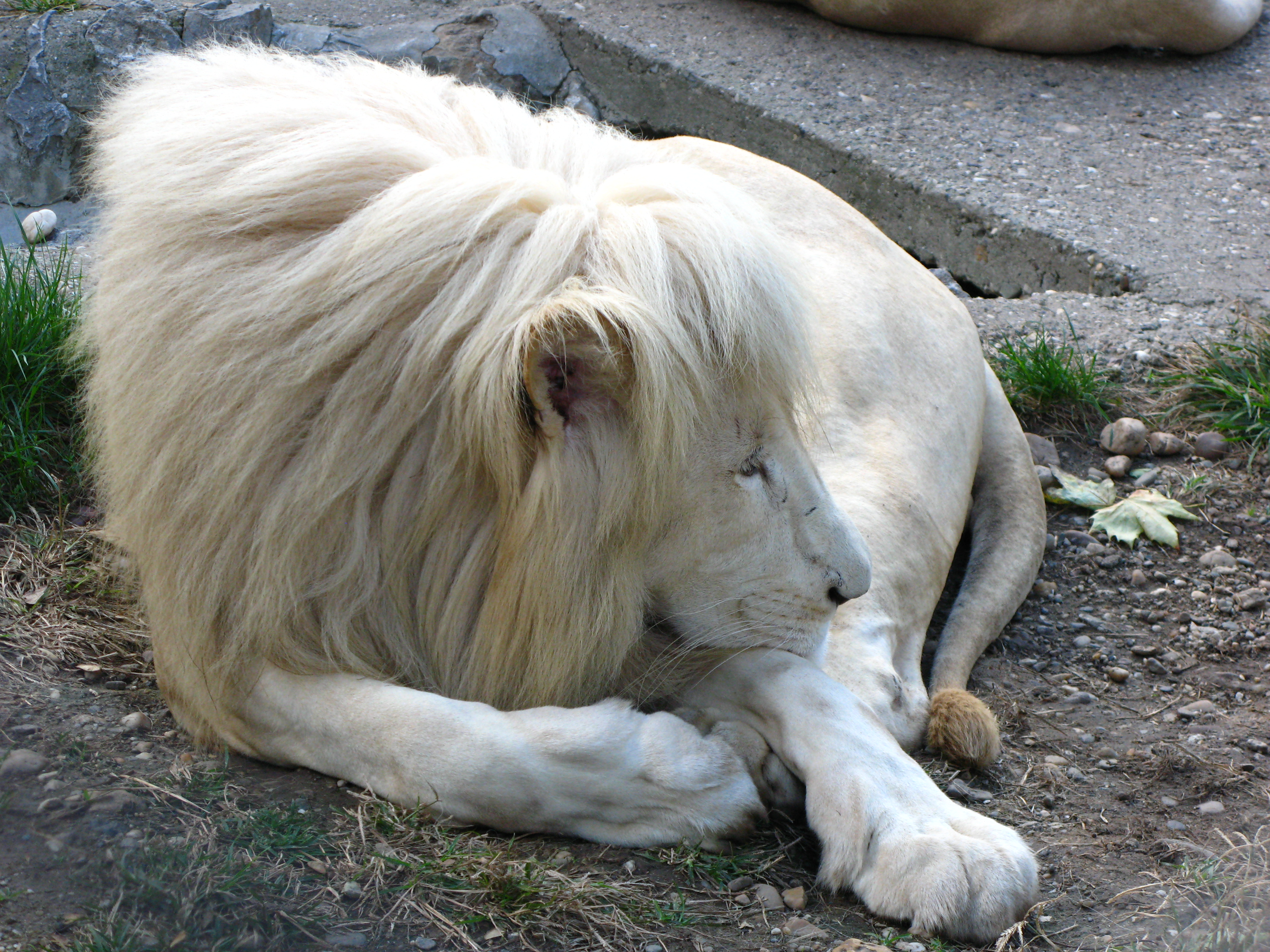
- White lion, the zoo's big attraction
- Interactive map of Belgrade Zoo
- 44°49′33″N 20°27′12″E
- Date opened: 12 July 1936; 90 years ago
- Location: Kalemegdan Park, Belgrade, Serbia
- Land area: 7 hectares (17 acres)
- No. of animals: 800+
- No. of species: 210 (2021)
- Annual visitors: 395,000 (2023)
- Director: Srboljub Aleksić
- Website: Official website

Beo zoo vrt (Serbian Cyrillic: Бео зоо врт), also known as Vrt dobre nade (Serbian Cyrilic: Врт добре наде, The Garden of good hope), is a publicly owned zoo in Belgrade, Serbia. Established on 12 July 1936, it situated in the historic Kalemegdan Park. Belgrade zoo covers an area of 7 hectares (17 acres) and houses a collection of 210 animal species, with approximately 800 individuals, making it the largest zoological garden in Serbia. With around 400,000 annual visitors it is also recognized as one of the most popular tourist attractions in Belgrade.

== History ==
During the Austrian occupation of northern Serbia from 1717 to 1739, they conducted extensive project of rebuilding Belgrade, turning the city into Westernized European, baroque-style town. This period is today referred to as the Baroque Belgrade. The governor in this period, Charles Alexander, Duke of Württemberg, ordered the construction of Württemberg Palace, a massive building used as his seat, which was located at the modern Republic Square area. There, he formed something of the first zoo in Belgrade. He ordered his soldiers to capture and bring to him "wild beasts from the forests and mountains of Serbia", which were then kept in cages. The Austrians withdrew in 1739 and the Ottomans demolished the building in 1743.

The Belgrade's first general urban plan, which was adopted in 1924, envisioned construction of the zoo in Topčider, at the time on the outskirts of the city.

The present Belgrade Zoological Garden was officially opened on 12 July 1936 by the mayor of Belgrade, Vlada Ilić. The zoo was initially no larger than 3.5 hectares (8.6 acres), but was eventually expanded to about 14 hectares. It quickly became one of the most popular places with the locals and even with the members of the Karađorđević dynasty, who were regulars at the zoo. In the beginning, animals were acquired through personal donations. First group of animals was purchased by mayor Ilić himself while the first manager, Aleksandar Krstić, purchased the first hippopotamus in 1937 to celebrate the birth of his son.

During the Second World War, the zoo was bombed twice, by the Nazis in 1941 and by the Allies in 1944, heavily damaging the infrastructure and killing most of the animals. The zoo also lost seven hectares of land. The 1941 bombing of the zoo was described in Winston Churchill's The Second World War and Emir Kusturica's 1995 film Underground. Miodrag Savković, manager of the zoo during the World War II occupation, was arrested right away by the new Communist authorities, and shot, even though the charges against him nor his resting place are known.

The zoo recovered over time but again faced tough times in the eighties. Animals were neglected and living in bad conditions. In 1984 the zoo received a pair of black rhinoceroses as a gift from the Prime Minister Robert Mugabe and the country of Zimbabwe. Unfortunately, they lived for just a couple of months due to bad care and lack of knowledge about this species. In 1989 Muammar Gaddafi also gave six of his Arabian camels. The government, under the pressure of real estate groups also unsuccessfully tried to appropriate the space to build luxurious hotels, casinos and nightclubs. Belgrade zoo was preserved thanks to efforts from sculptor Vuk Bojović, who served as the zoo's director between May 1, 1986 and his death on September 17, 2014. He received substantial recognition for his work throughout the region. Bojović made various improvements to the living conditions of animals, brought numerous new species to the animal collection - most notably great apes, white tigers, and lions - changed the zoo's bad management, and made it a profitable business.

During the tenure of mayor Dragan Đilas (2008–13), the idea of expanding the zoo to Donji Grad, which it occupied prior to the World War II, resurfaced, but the experts and Bojović himself were against it. The urban plan for the fortress from 1965 already projected the complete relocation of the zoo outside of the fortress, on some of the suburban locations, which in later plans included Veliko Blato, Stepin Lug or Jelezovac. The expansion of the zoo would block the pedestrian pathways between the Danube's and Sava's parts of the fortress, which had been blocked in 1949 but then restored in 2009 with the reconstruction and opening of the Sava Gate. Also, it would prevent the exploration of Donji Grad, which is still largely unexplored and leave the Gate of Charles VI, a masterpiece of Balthasar Neumann, within the zoo itself. By 2017, the zoo had not relocated and the idea of expansion was dropped. There were also ideas to relocate the zoo to the Great War Island, or to the western city outskirts, in Surčin.

In 2022, new city administration headed by mayor Aleksandar Šapić again included relocation of the zoo in the city's urban plan. In February 2023, Šapić announced relocation to the Ada Safari section of Ada Ciganlija island. In turn, this would include relocation of 273 families who live in the area, in the Partizan settlement. The relocation will last for several years. City manager, Miroslav Čučković, explained the relocation: "Since the foundation of the new city administration...we made decisions which are connected to our dedication to spaces to which Belgraders were coming close to in all of these previous years. Those are spaces for which we think should have some new type of content and possibility to directly invest into them". Šapić added that the "political decision was made to handle this", and, if everything goes by the plan, the relocation might be finished in three years.

The new zoo should double its size, from 7 ha (17 acres) to 14 ha (35 acres). In order to ease the access to the zoo on an island, city will push the construction of the pedestrian bridge and revitalize the project of gondola lift from New Belgrade to Košutnjak, via Ada. Public and expert's backlash against the project was massive, especially regarding hastiness, arbitration, irrelevance, legality and selected location. Public speculated that the residents of the newly built affluent K-Distrikt residential complex across the zoo are bothered by the smell, or that some more lucrative structures might be built instead of the zoo on such exceptional location. Also, relocation to Ada is not legally founded in any of the city plans or documents.

Šapić then back-pedaled a bit, stating that this is just a "political idea" which is not hastily made, that only now analyses and surveys will be done to check the viability, that nothing will be built instead of the zoo but the fortress will be conserved, and that there is no set time frame for the project. However, residents from Partizan said that they were approached regarding their resettlement already in July 2022 but without any mentioning of the zoo to them, which they consider a proof that the relocation was an ad hoc idea.

== Animals and exhibits ==
Belgrade zoo displays a collection of around 800 animals represented by 200 different species. Some of the animal species at Belgrade zoo include:

- Mammals: Parma wallaby, red kangaroo, Asian elephant, giant anteater, southern three-banded armadillo, ring-tailed lemur, De Brazza's monkey, brown capuchin, Bornean orangutan, common chimpanzee, Indian crested porcupine, capybara, Patagonian mara, African lion, Bengal tiger, cheetah, Eurasian lynx, serval, binturong, Meerkat, spotted hyena, Arctic wolf, fennec fox, brown bear, Cape fur seal, honey badger, oriental small-clawed otter, raccoon, coatimundi, Grant's zebra, Brazilian tapir, hippopotamus, Bactrian camel, alpaca, llama, fallow deer, red deer, reindeer, reticulated giraffe, American bison, Barbary sheep, Common eland, Himalayan thar, European mouflon, Siberian ibex, yak
- Birds: ostrich, rhea, southern cassowary, emu, greater flamingo, grey crowned crane, Humboldt penguin, marabou stork, scarlet ibis, white spoonbill, silvery-cheeked hornbill, Papuan hornbill, southern ground hornbill, laughing kookaburra, Andean condor, bearded vulture, griffon vulture, Egyptian vulture, Steller's sea eagle, several species of parrots
- Reptiles: American alligator, Cuban crocodile, spectacled caiman, savannah monitor, green iguana, several species of snakes and tortoises.

One of the biggest attractions at the zoo are white lions, which hold a symbolic meaning given that Belgrade's name means "white city". The first pair came from the Kruger National Park in 2005, making Belgrade the first zoo in Europe to house white lions. Since welcoming its first cub in 2008, the zoo has had significant success in breeding white lions. Another popular exhibit at Belgrade Zoo is its penguin enclosure, which was constructed in May 2019. It initially displayed seventeen Humboldt penguins which arrived from Vienna and the Emirates. In May 2021, the zoo welcomed its first penguin hatchling. Belgrade Zoo also features domestic animals, like alpacas, rabbits and pygmy goats, at the petting zoo, at its petting zoo, which was reopened in April 2019. The walk-through outdoor exhibit extending over 1000 m^{2} also features a coffee shop and a children's playground.

Ahead of Belgrade Zoo's 90th anniversary in July 2026, the zoo's director, Srboljub Aleksić, emphasized plans to place greater focus on visitor education and animal care by opening a new veterinary clinic and an education center. He also highlighted the zoo's recent reconstruction projects, including the enclosures for brown bears, flamingos, ring-tailed lemurs, and elephants, as well as plans to renovate the sea lion pool and ape house, and to introduce new enclosures for birds of pray and giant anteaters.

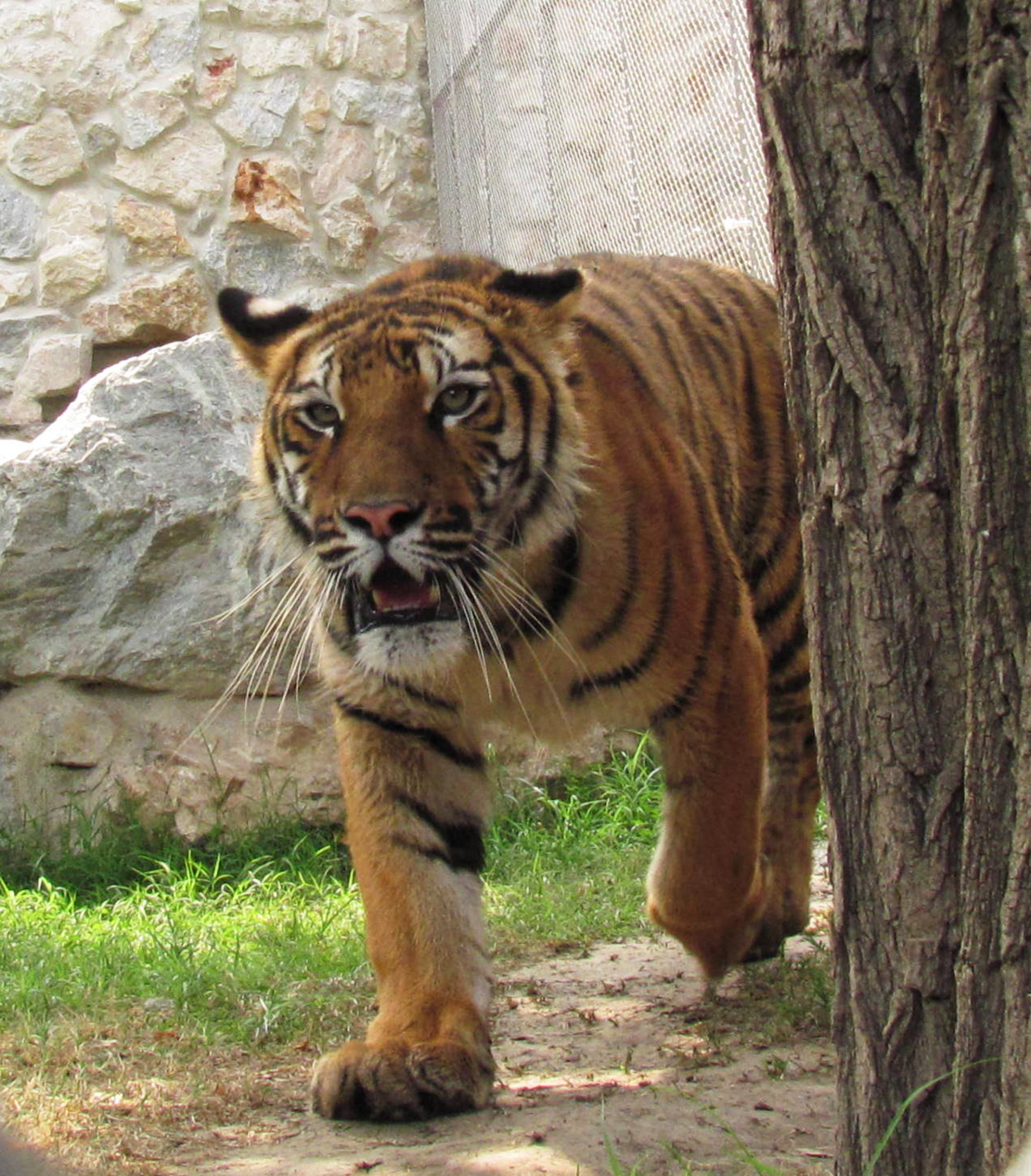
Bengal tiger

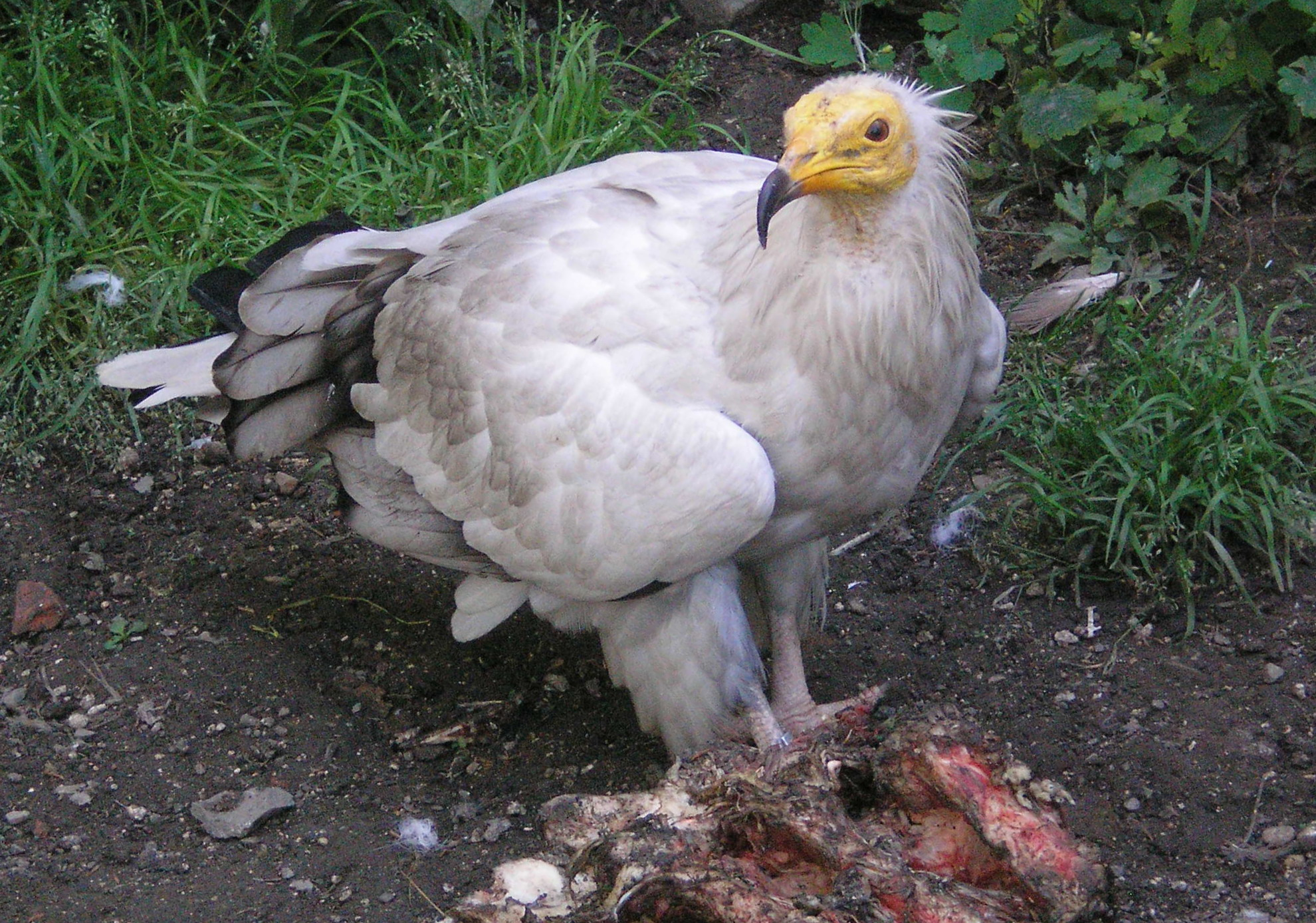
Egyptian vulture

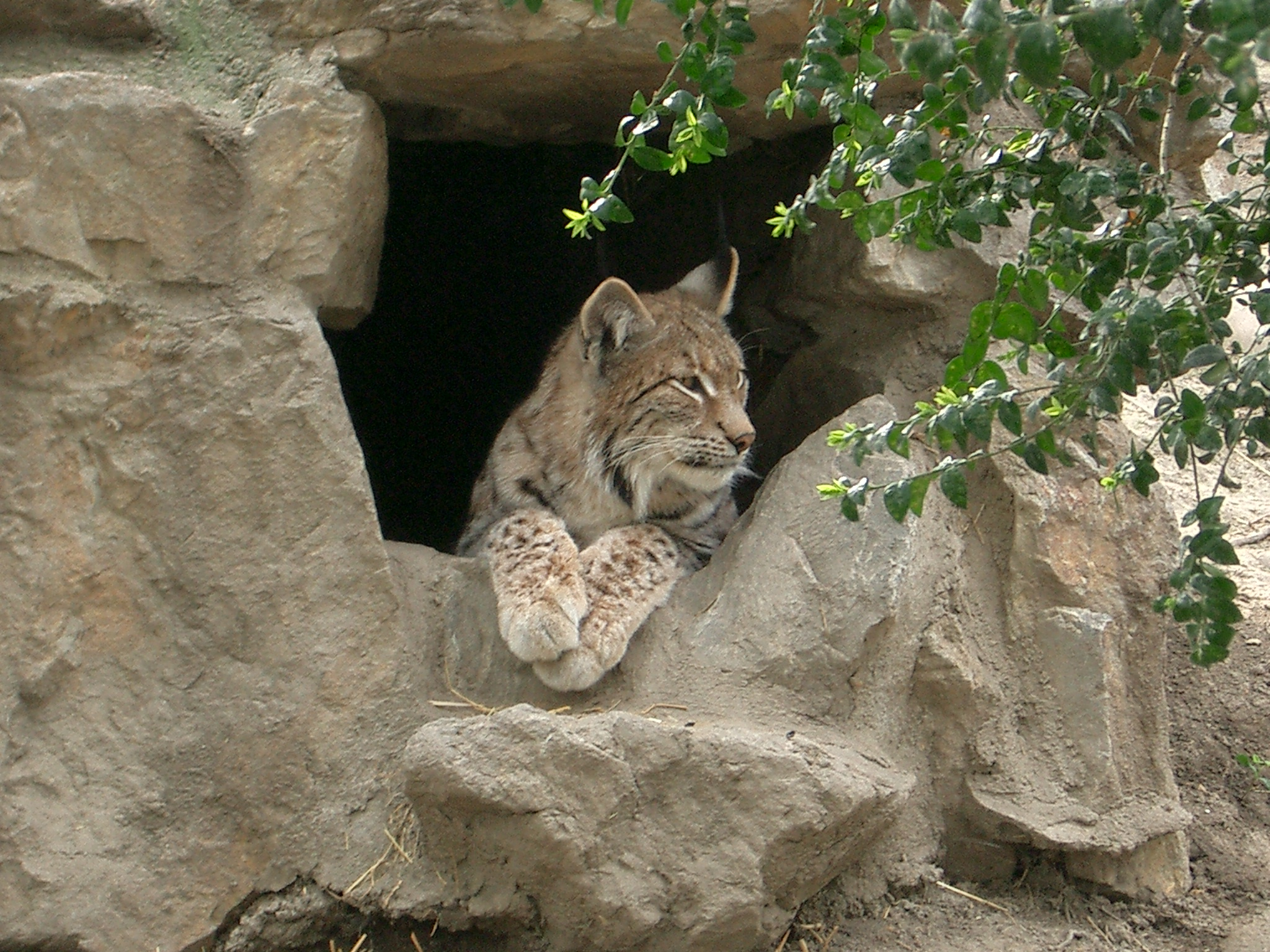
Eurasian lynx

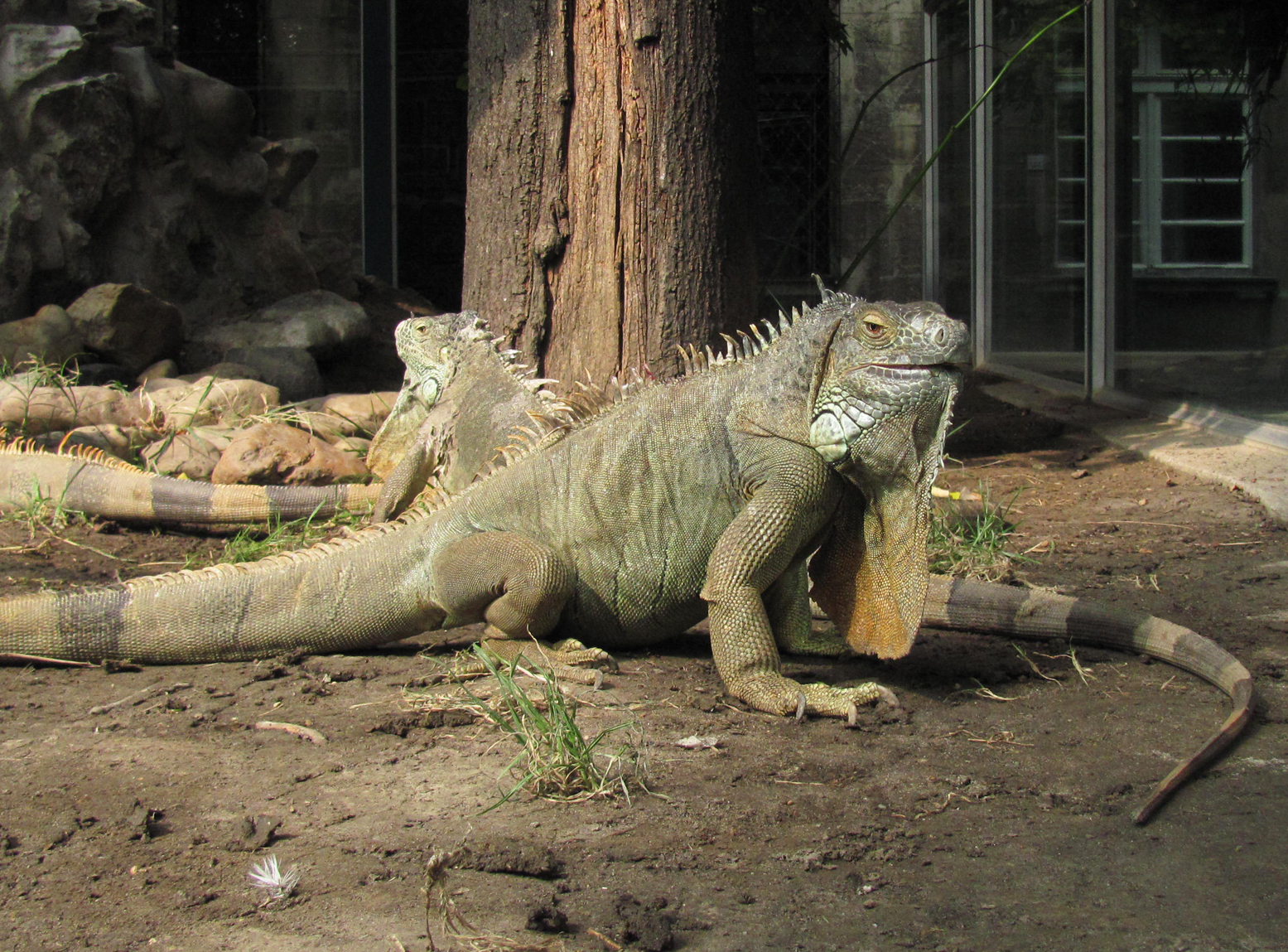
Green iguanas

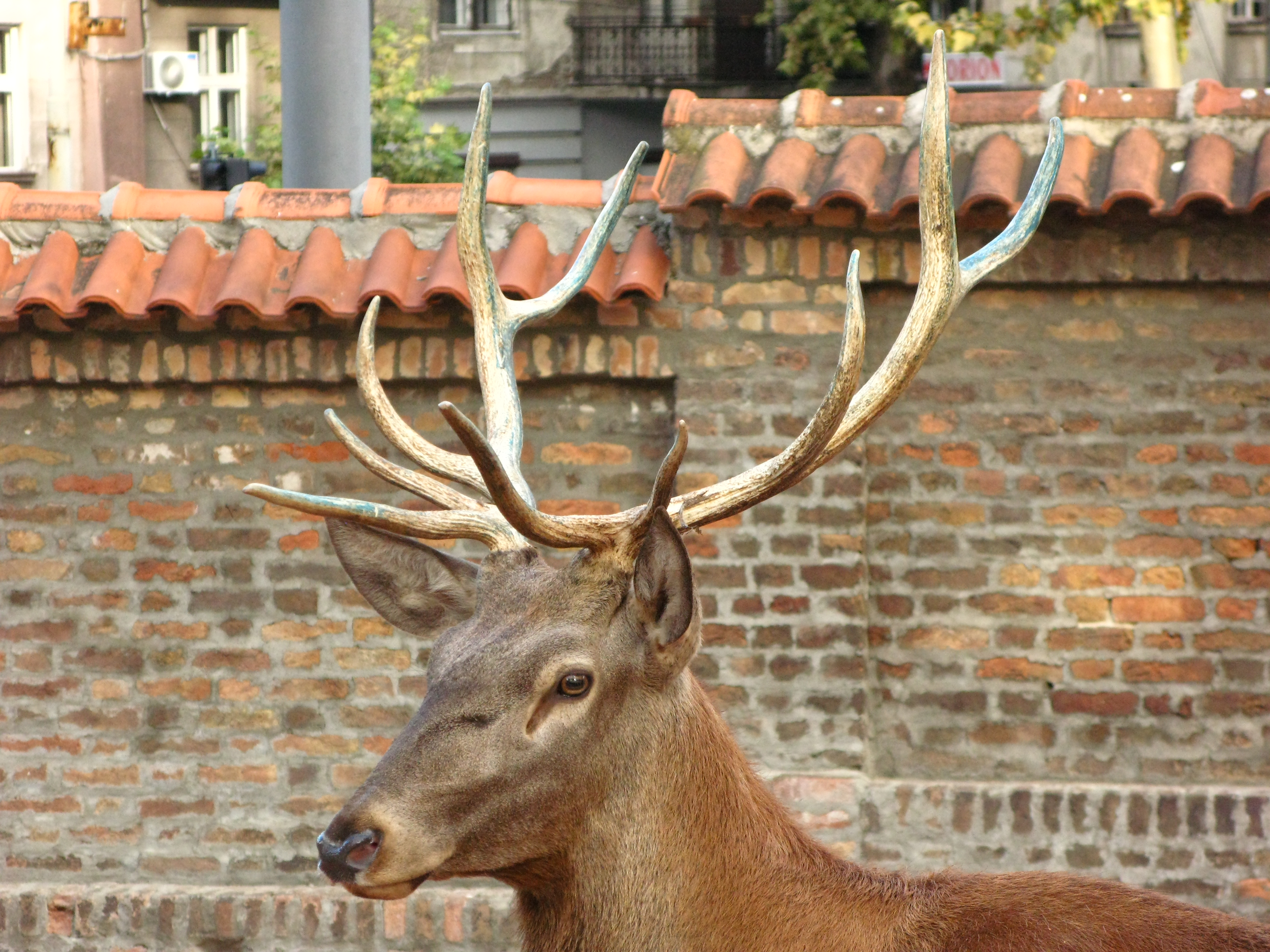
Red deer

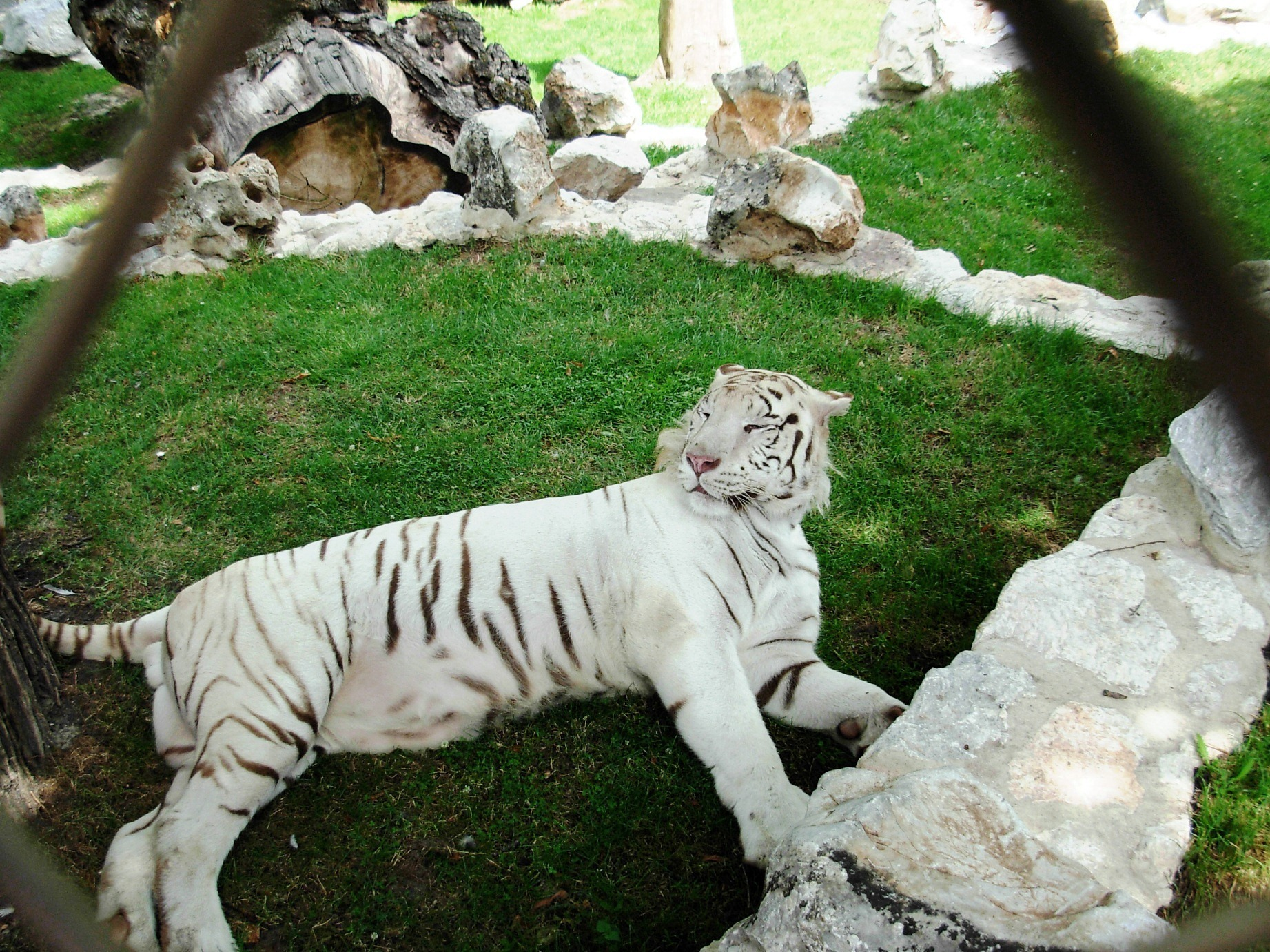
White tiger

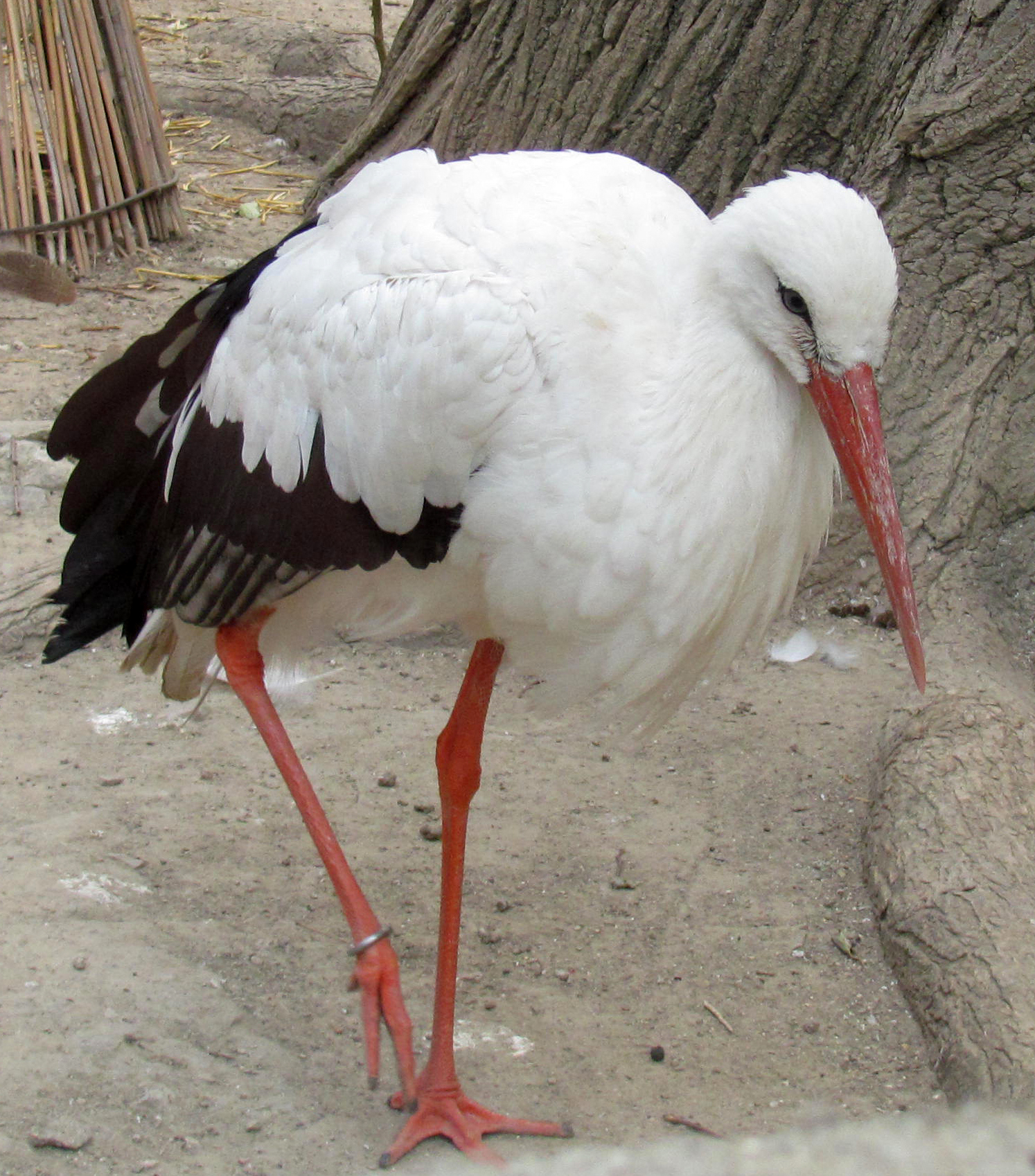
White stork

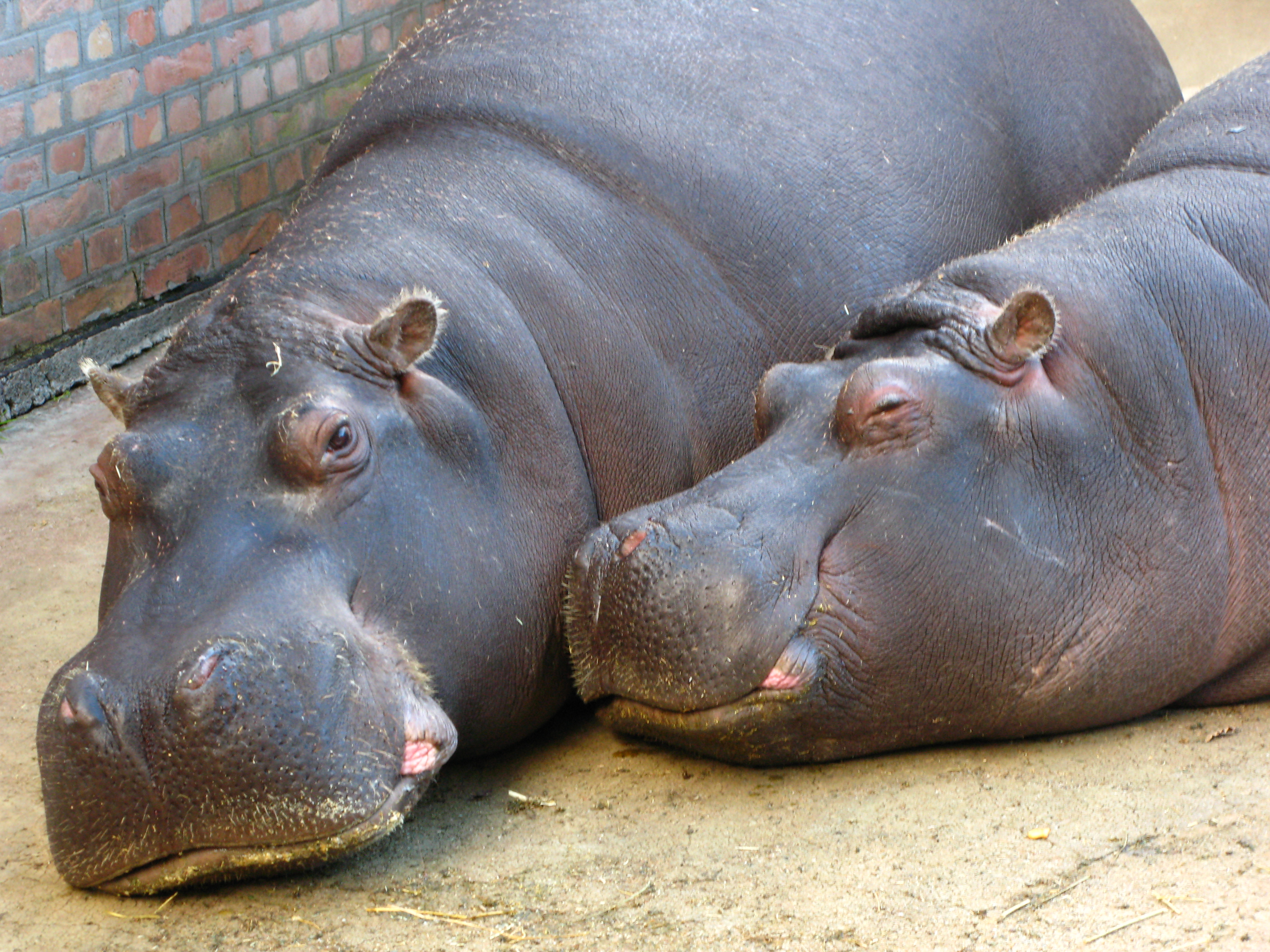
Hippopotamus mother with a calf

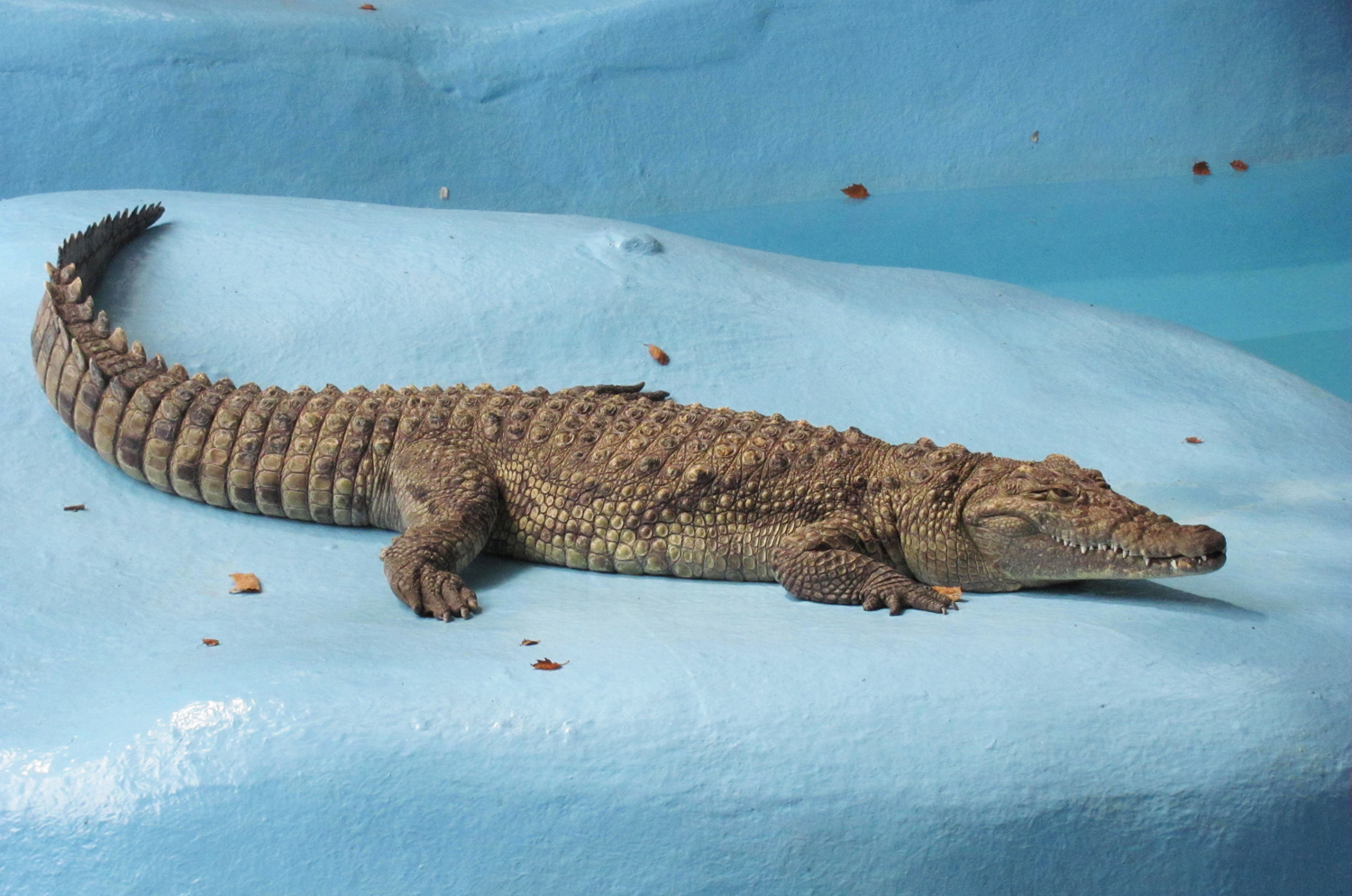
Nile crocodile

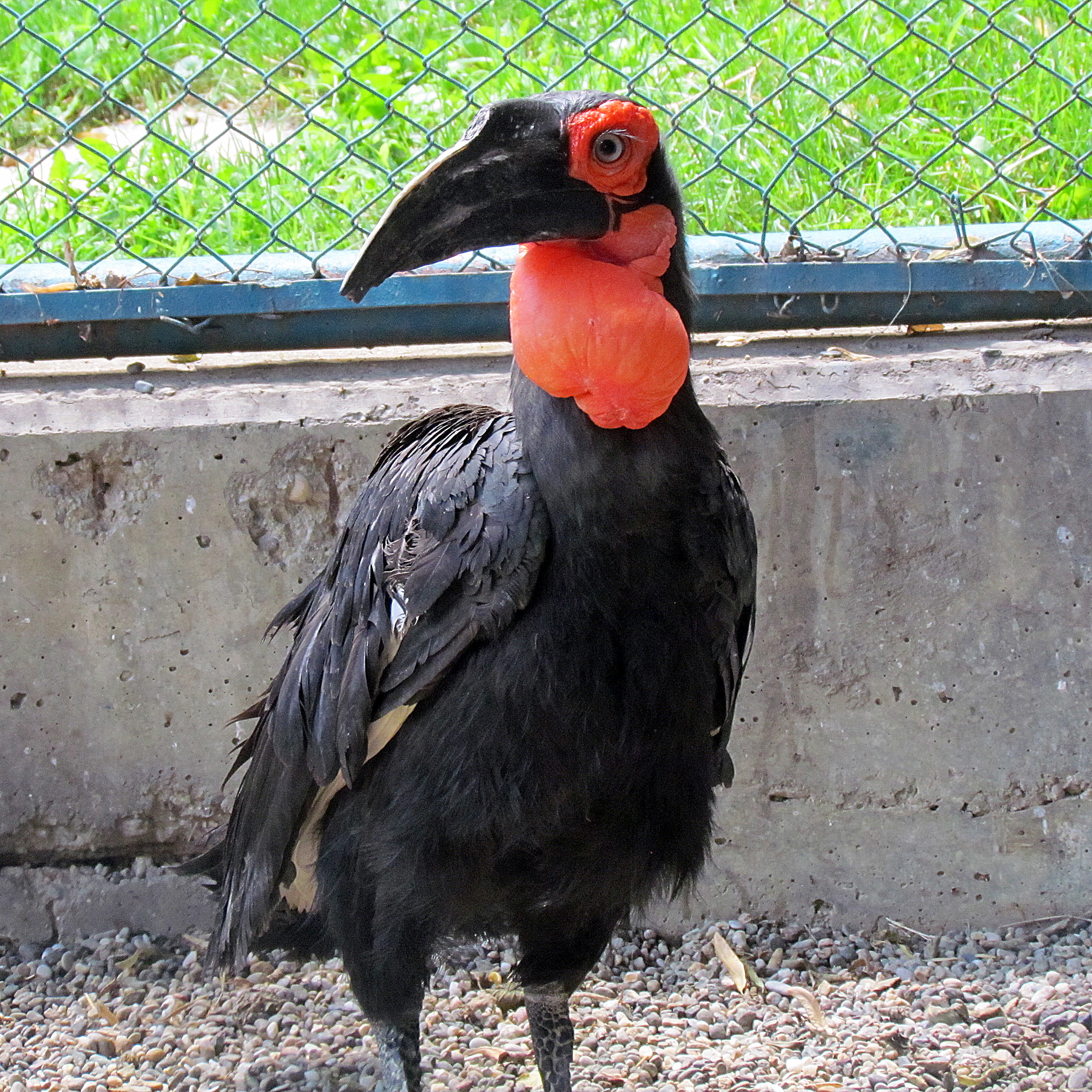
Southern ground hornbill

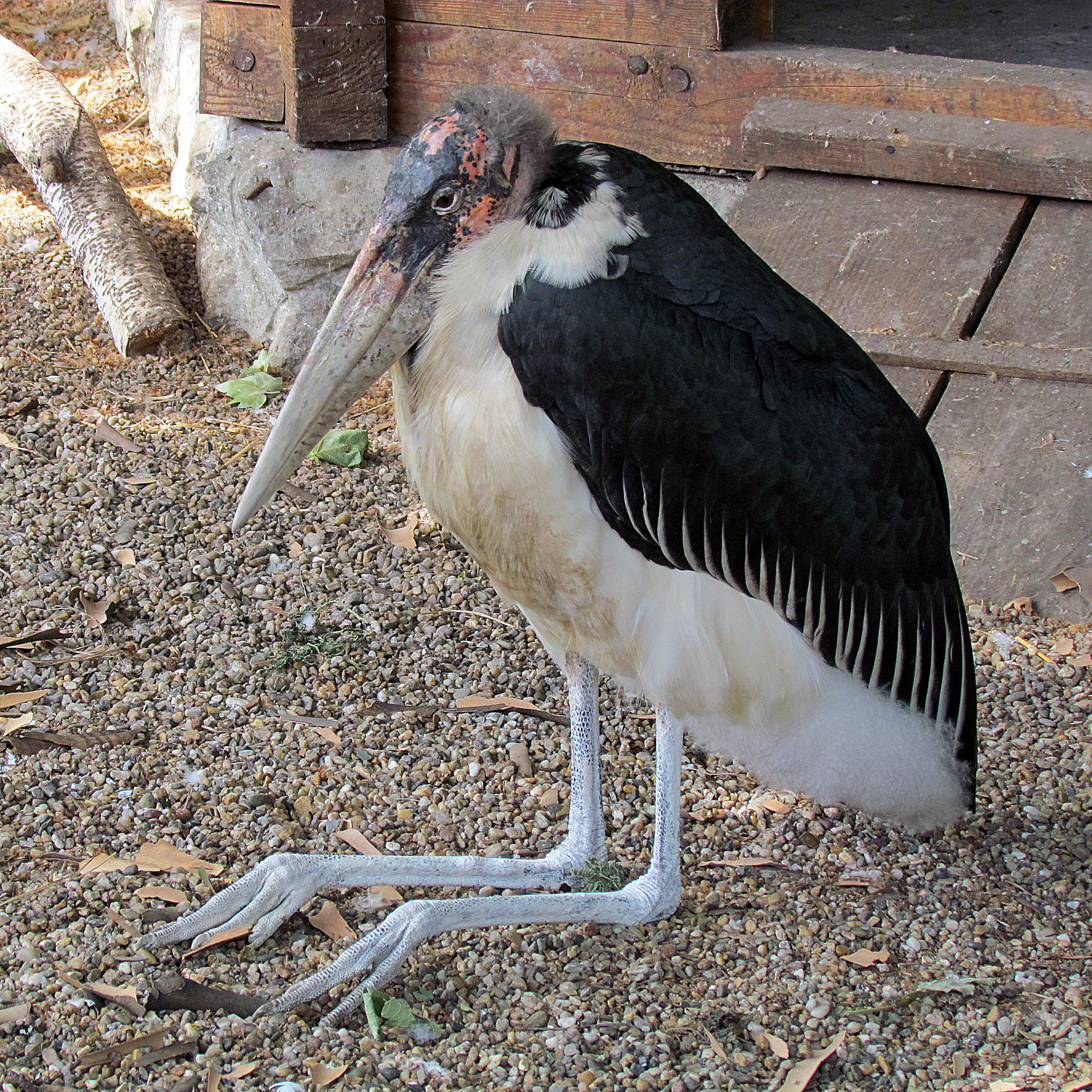
Marabou

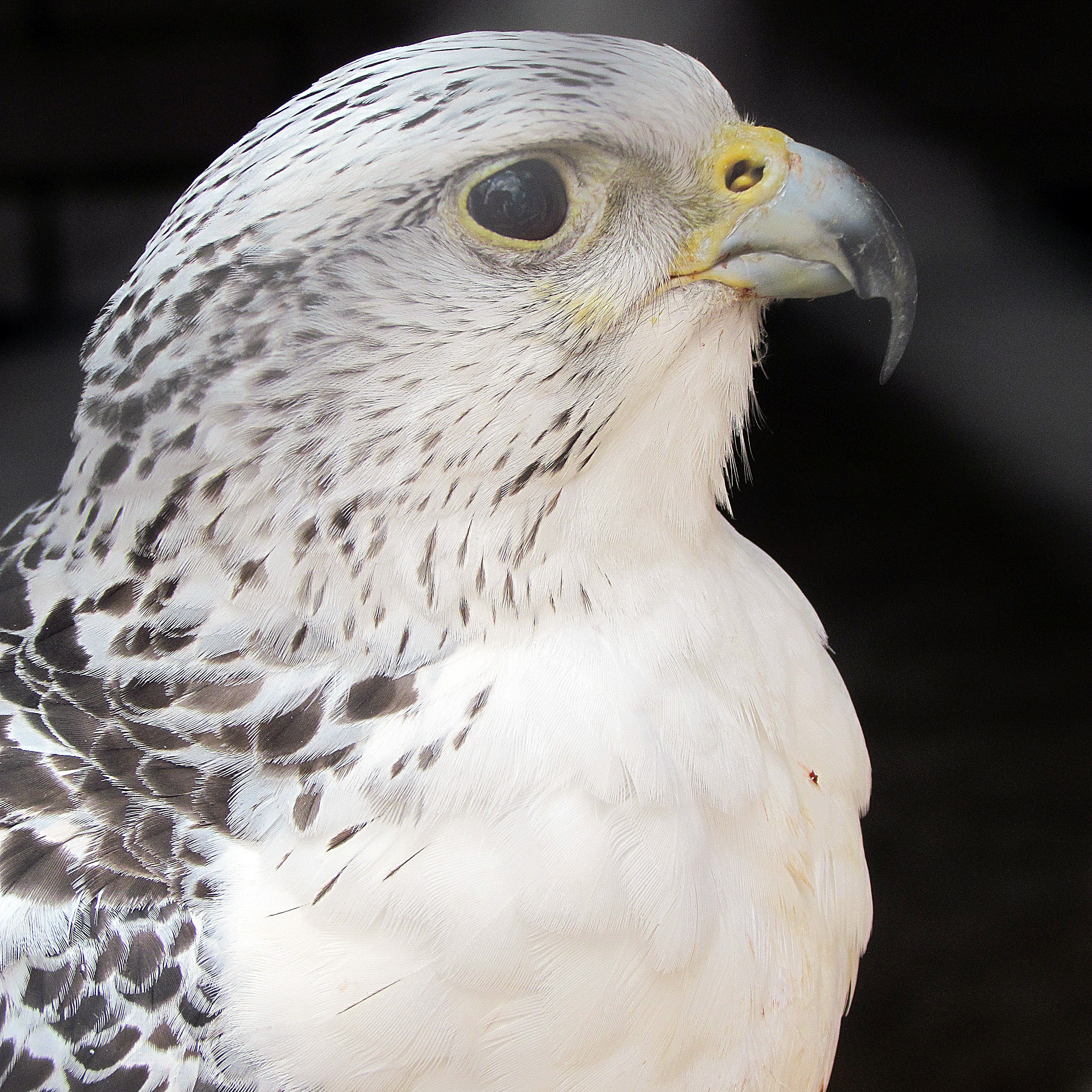
Gyrfalcon

=== Notable animals ===
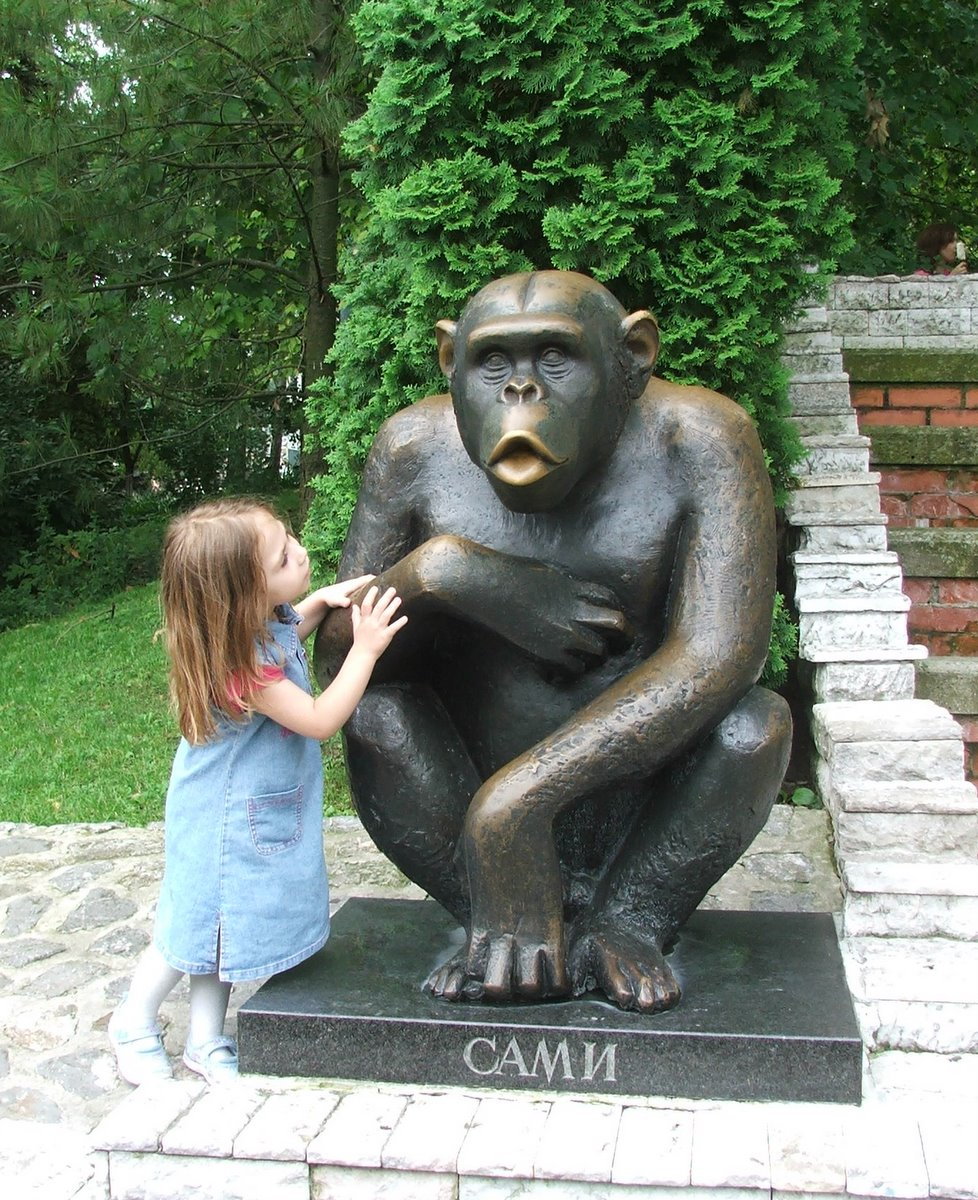
Statue of Sami the chimpanzee

American alligator Muja is considered the world's oldest living alligator. Although his exact age is unknown, he arrived at Belgrade Zoo from a zoo in Germany on September 12, 1937, already as an adult. In 2012, his right front foot was surgically amputated due to gangrene. In 2018, Muja was officially recognized by Guinness World Records as the oldest living alligator in captivity.

Gabi was a German Shepherd that saved her handler, a night guard, from an escaped jaguar in 1987. Although she was seriously wounded during the encounter, Gabi eventually recovered and resumed her duties as a guard dog. The Zoo features a statue dedicated to Gabi.

Sami the chimpanzee was the first great ape to be exhibited at the zoo. In February 1988, he received widespread public attention after escaping from his enclosure just one month after his arrival. After wandering through downtown Belgrade for about an hour, Sami was calmed by the zoo's manager, Vuk Bojović, who placed him in his car and drove him back to the zoo. Two days later, Sami escaped again but was this time recaptured using a tranquilizer gun. Sami died on September 11, 1992. Belgrade Zoo also has a statue dedicated to Sami located next to the ape house.

== See also ==
- Palić Zoo
- Tourism in Serbia
