= Balkan Cinema building, Belgrade =

Coordinates: 44.816525°N 20.462186°E

"Balkan" Cinema
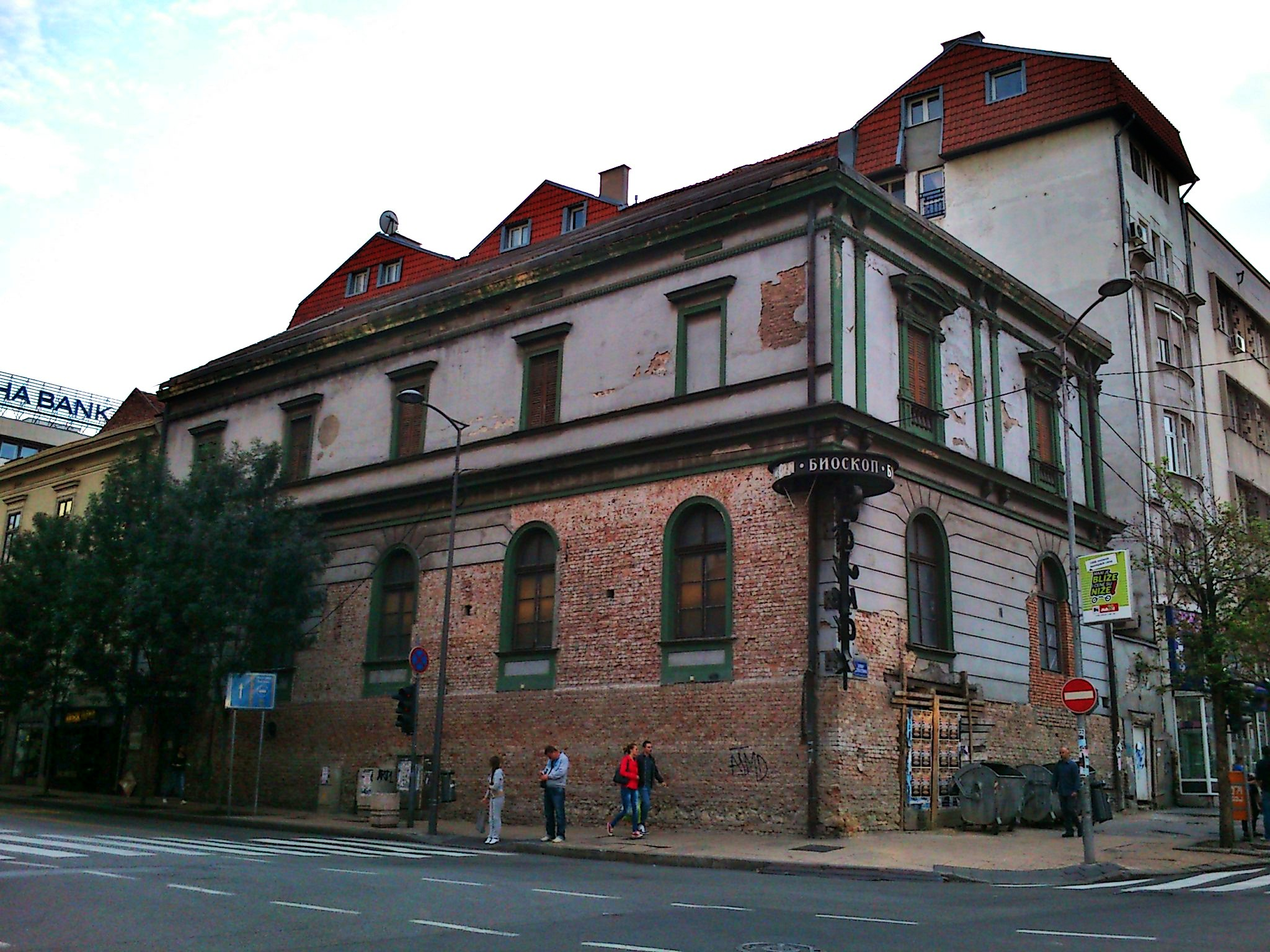
- Interactive map of the "Balkan" Cinema area

General information
- Classification: Cultural monument
- Location: Stari grad, Belgrade, Serbia
- Construction started: 1870
- Balkan Cinema building, Belgrade
- Parent institution: Institute for the Protection of Cultural Heritage of Serbia
- Address: 14, Kalemegdan, 11000
- Location: Belgrade
- Website: beogradskonasledje.rs

Cinema "Balkan" (Serbian: Биоскоп "Балкан", Bioskop "Balkan") is located in Belgrade at 16 Braće Jugovića Street. As the location of significant events in the history of Belgrade and Serbia, the "Balkan" Cinema represents a testimony to the cultural, urban and architectural development of Belgrade since the second half of the 19th century. It has had the status of a cultural monument since 1984.

== History ==
=== Origin ===
The building was built between 1867 and 1870 on the foundations of the former Turkish caravanserai. The one floor edifice was financed by Đorđe Pašona, manufacturer of alcoholic beverages. It was originally intended to partially host the Bulevar hotel and partially to have commercial areas for renting. The hotel with 14 rooms occupied to upper floor, while kafanas and shops, with a garden and a backyard, were located on the ground level. Pašona took a loan from Vanđel Toma, a well-known tobacco manufacturer, to build the hotel, but ran out of money, so after several years he handed over the edifice to Toma as a collateral. Toma fully bought it out in 1900, after Pašona's death. During the construction, asked what is this big thing he is building, Pašona (originally a Cincar from Macedonia) replied in his southern accent Šta zidam? Zidam si sikiraciju od tvrd materijal! ("What am I building? I am building aggravation made of solid material!". The first film was shown at the hotel Bulevar in 1899.

=== 20th century ===
The building, built in the 'academic style', consists of three separate units between the modern streets of Makedonska, Braće Jugovića and Despot Stefan Boulevard, next to which a part of the building was added later, whose ground included a large hall for dancing and weddings. This Hall decorated with elaborate chandeliers, large mirrors and lanterns in the late 19th century, hosted the Austrian and Czech musical chapel, so the Boulevard became the "first Belgrade Music Hall". It often hosted capellas from Austria and Bohemia. The Belgrade Opera operated from 1909 to 1911 in the building, under the direction of Žarko Savić; thus the entire hotel later became known as the "Opera". It was seat of the comedy-vaudeville theatre "Orfeum".

Only three years after hosting the first film screening in Belgrade, in 1899, the building began to operate as the first permanent cinema in Belgrade in 1912 under the name "Grand Cinema of Gomon Family at the Opera Hotel." The "Balkan" Cinema was given its current name at the beginning of 1928.

At one time theatre performances by the comedian Brana Cvetković also took place at the hotel. His cabaret was known as the "Brana's Orpheum", in which he commented everyday events. Cvetković undertook most roles himself, acting as a screenwriter, director, scenic designer, composer, conférencier and actor. Many Serbian actors had guest appearances, including Žanka Stokić, which here originated her comedic character of 'Pela the Washerwoman'. The "Orpheum" always started with the "Report", which consisted of different lyrics on one the same melody. This concept was taken after World War II by the "Joyful evening" (Veselo veče), one of the most popular radio shows in Serbia.

The "Ruska Lira" kafana, renamed "Zora" after World War II, was located in the building, on the Makedonska Street side. In it, the pilots of the 6th Fighter Aviation Regiment, which defended the capital Belgrade, waited for the orders in the wake of the German attack in 1941. A little after the midnight on 6 April 1941 they were summoned and were transported to the airport in Tošin Bunar by the taxis which also waited all day in front of the building.

=== 21st century ===
Thanks to the film director Darko Bajić, the cinema continued to operate until 2008. It was later sold to a privately owned company which closed it in 2010 for "emergency reconstruction". After years of controversial actions surrounding the building (changing of the interior, even though the building is protected by the law, and apparent attempt to change the purpose of the building), the investors said that they are actually trying to reconstruct the interior so that Balkan can be cinema again. However, in 2018 it was still "under reconstruction". In March 2018, the owner of the building, Saša Marčeta, founder of the MaxBet group, who was imprisoned for 6 months in a court case concerning the purchase of the building, announced that the reconstructed cinema will be open in the fall of 2020.

Marčeta claimed that he purchased the building for €3 million, that he invested €2 million, and that additional €2 million will be needed to finish everything. Since the late 2018, part of the cinema was opened for public as the exhibition space for plays, shows, concerts, and multimedia exhibitions. Exterior and its decorative lights were finished by November 2019. The hall and the balcony will have a total of 250 seats and telescopic bleachers.

== See more ==
- List of cultural monuments in Belgrade
