= Bleacher =

Stand for spectators, e.g. in stadiums

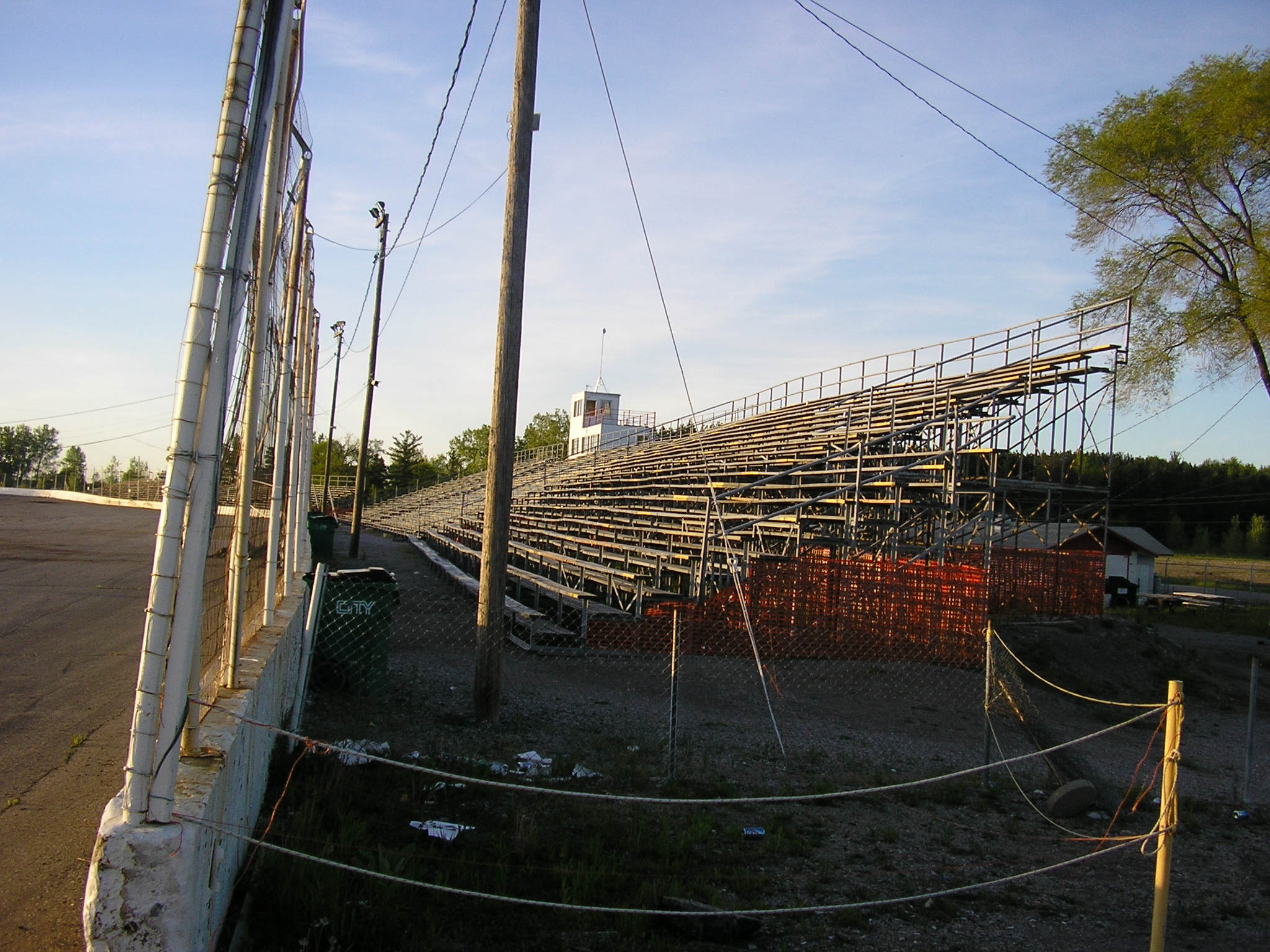
Wooden bleachers

Bleachers (North American English), or stands, are raised, tiered rows of benches found at sports-fields and at other spectator events. Stairways provide access to the horizontal rows of seats, often with every other step enabling access to a row of benches.

Benches range from simple planks to elaborate ones with backrests. Many bleachers are open to the ground below so that there are only the planks to sit and walk on. Some bleachers have vertical panels beneath the benches, either partially or completely blocking the way to the ground.

== Name origins ==
The open seating area in baseball was called the "bleaching boards" as early as 1877. The term "bleachers" used in the sense of benches for spectators can be traced back to at least 1889; named as such because the generally uncovered wooden boards were "bleached by the sun".

The Dickson Baseball Dictionary lists as a secondary definition the fans sitting in them. By the early 1900s, the term "bleachers" was being used for both the seating area and its occupants.

In modern usage, the term "bleachers", which is not used outside North America, almost always refers only to the seating area, and those sitting there may be called "bleacher fans" or "bleacherites". Terms such as Chicago's "bleacher bums" or Yankee Stadium's Bleacher Creatures are also used.

== Types ==
Bleachers structures vary depending on the location, but most outdoor modern bleachers have either an aluminium tube or steel angle understructure (known as frame-type bleachers) or steel I-beams (known as an I-beam bleacher). Most smaller bleachers are frame-type bleachers and most larger bleachers are I-Beam bleachers. Bleachers range in size from small, modular, aluminum stands that can be moved around soccer or hockey fields to large permanent structures that flank each side of an American football field. Some bleachers have locker rooms underneath them. In indoor gyms, bleachers can be built in so that they slide on a track or on wheels and fold in an accordion-like, stacking manner against the inside walls. This type is known as telescoping bleachers.

== Baseball ==
In ballparks, the bleachers are usually located beyond the outfield fences. However, center-field bleachers are located in the line of sight of the batter, and the presence of fans makes it difficult for the batter to pick out the ball. As a result, most stadiums have vacant areas or black backgrounds where the seats would be. This is known as either the "backdrop" or the batter's eye. The old Yankee Stadium featured black-painted vacant bleachers, nicknamed "the black" by baseball fans.

Many ballparks, especially those in Minor League Baseball, offer only bleacher seating. In those that offer both seats and bleachers—‌such as in Major League Baseball—‌the bleachers are typically in less desirable locations, have lower ticket prices, or both, giving the term "bleachers" a connotation of lower-class seating.

== American football ==
The popularity of American football has made seating in outdoor and indoor football fields a necessity. Professional football, colleges, high schools, and even middle schools have bleacher systems set up to accommodate spectators. Bleachers vary in size from 10 feet (3 m) wide, seating 25, all the way to full stadiums that seat thousands and wrap around the entire field. As one example of their dimensions, Crystal Lake South High School in Illinois built some football bleachers that were about 50 feet (15 m) high. American football bleachers are commonly made from concrete or aluminum with concrete footings or superstructure underneath. Many college football stadiums use bleachers as their main source of seating.

== See also ==
- All-seater
- Mobile bleacher
- Grandstand
- Terrace (stadium)
- The gods (theatrical)
- Nosebleed seats
