= Osijek Zoo and Aquarium =

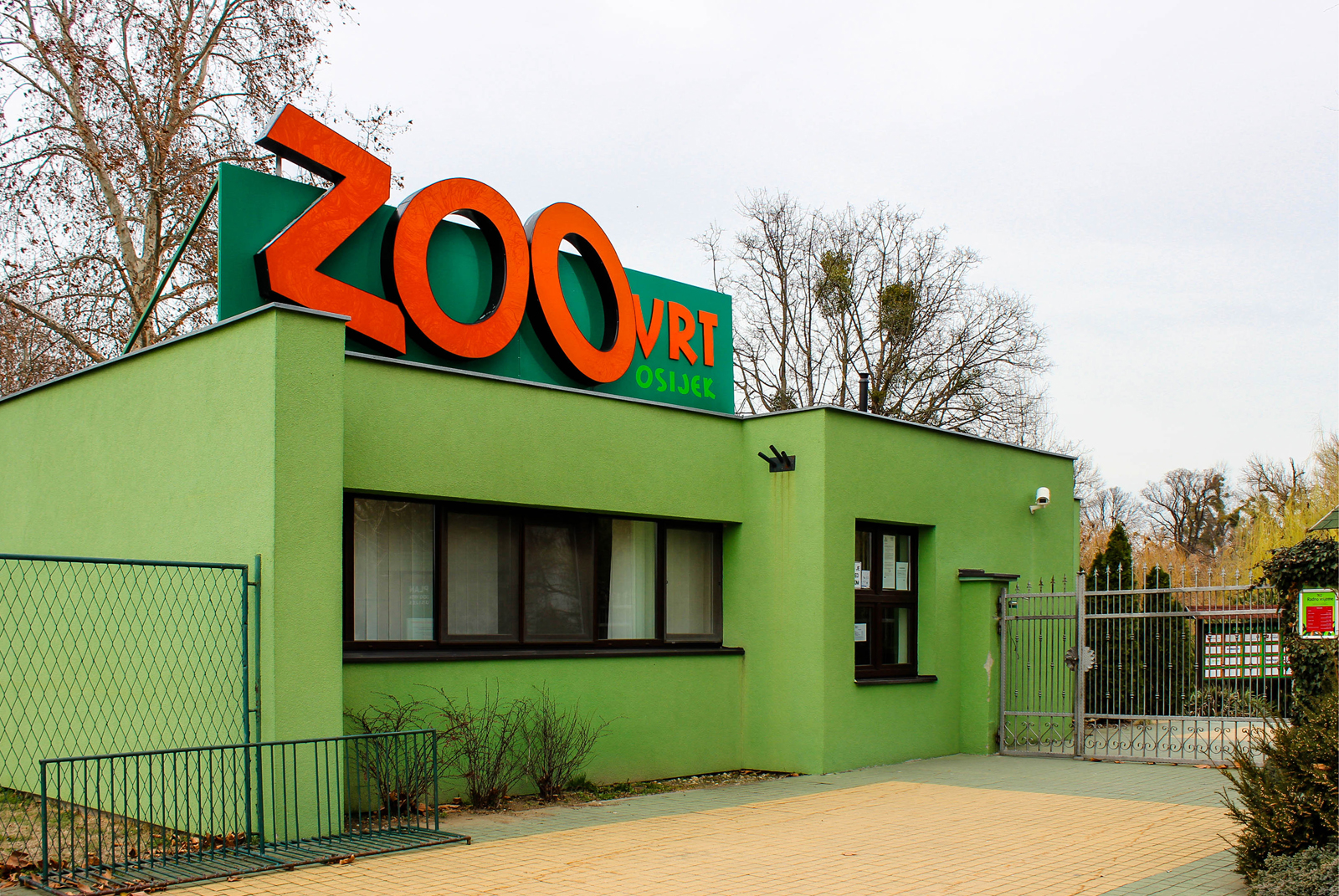
- Entrance
- Interactive map of Osijek Zoo and Aquarium
- 45°34′6″N 18°40′5″E
- Date opened: 1955
- Location: Osijek, Croatia
- Land area: 11 ha (27 acres)
- No. of animals: 650
- No. of species: 100
- Annual visitors: 100,000
- Director: Denis Vedlin.
- Website: www.zoo-osijek.hr/en/

Osijek Zoo and Aquarium (Croatian: Zoološki vrt i akvarij grada Osijeka) is an 11-hectare (27-acre) zoo in Osijek, Croatia. It is located on the banks of the Drava river opposite the city of Osijek, and is the biggest Zoo in Croatia.

== History ==
The zoo is located on the left bank of the Drava River, it opened in 1955 and extends over 11 hectares of Slavonian forest, making it the largest such institution in Croatia.

Osijek Zoo is open 365 days a year, including Saturdays, Sundays, holidays and public holidays, and working hours are adjusted to the length of the day according to the seasons.

== Animal Species ==
The ZOO is home to 103 species of animals. In total, there are about 1,000 animals from all over the world.

== Gallery ==
Osijek Zoo

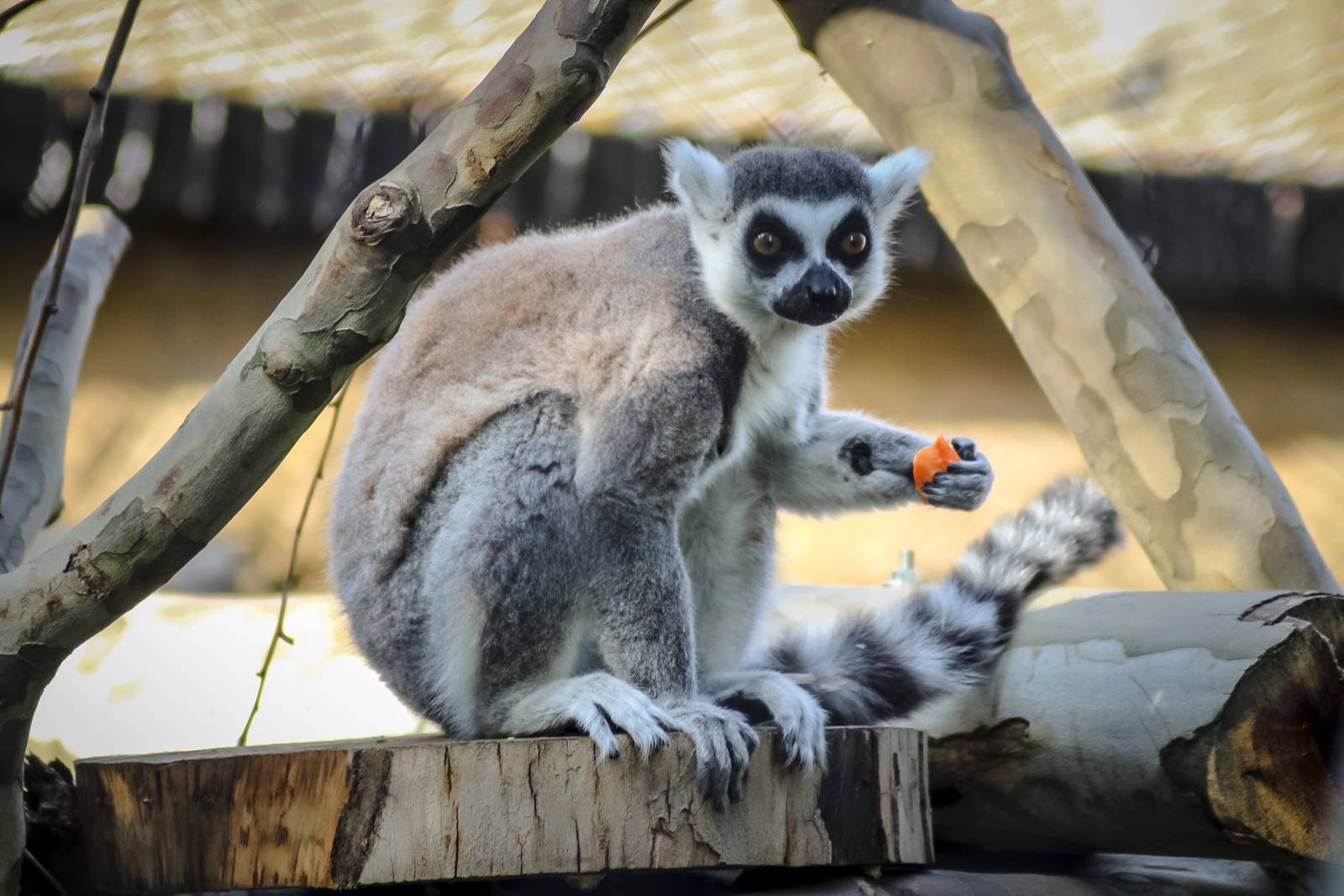

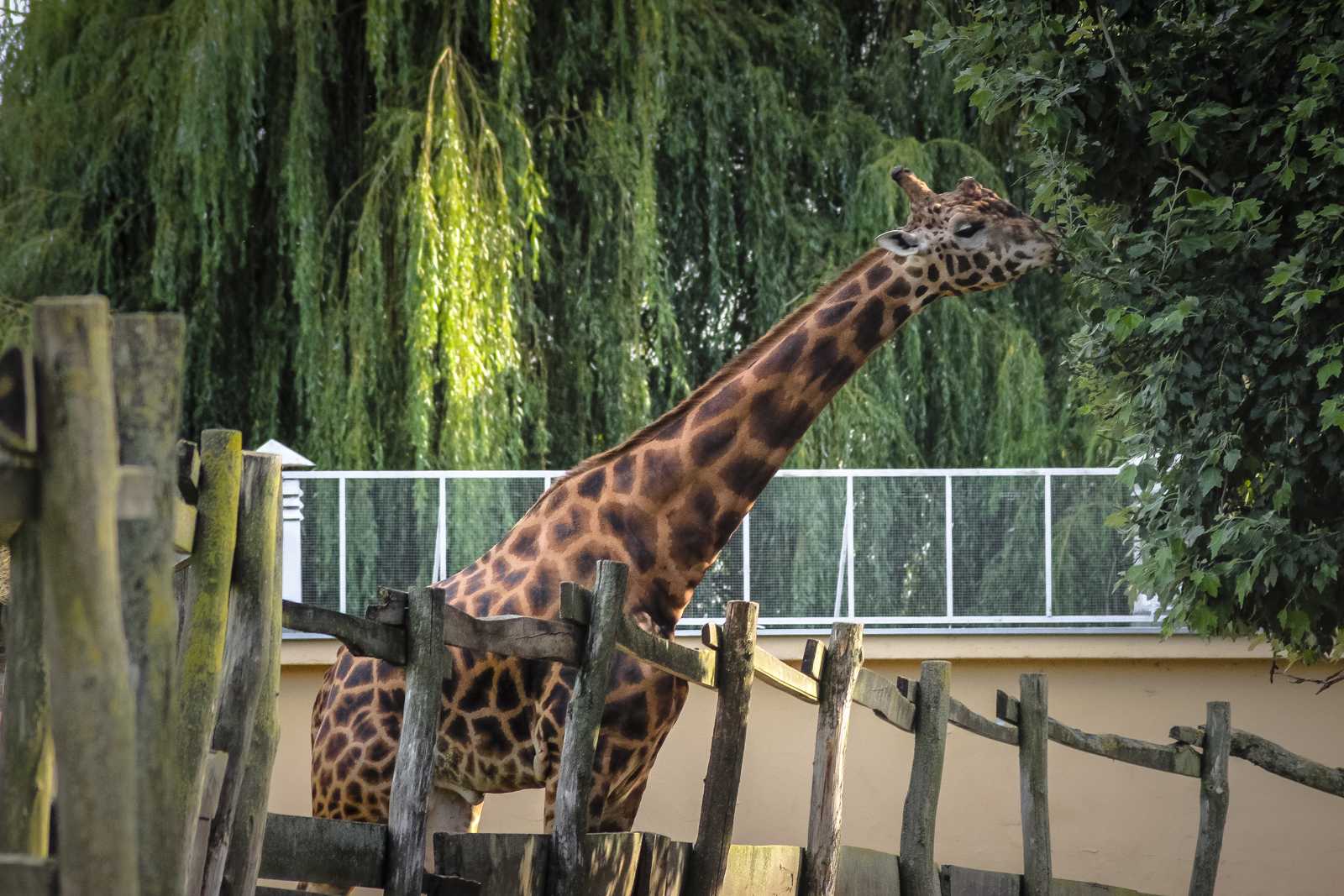

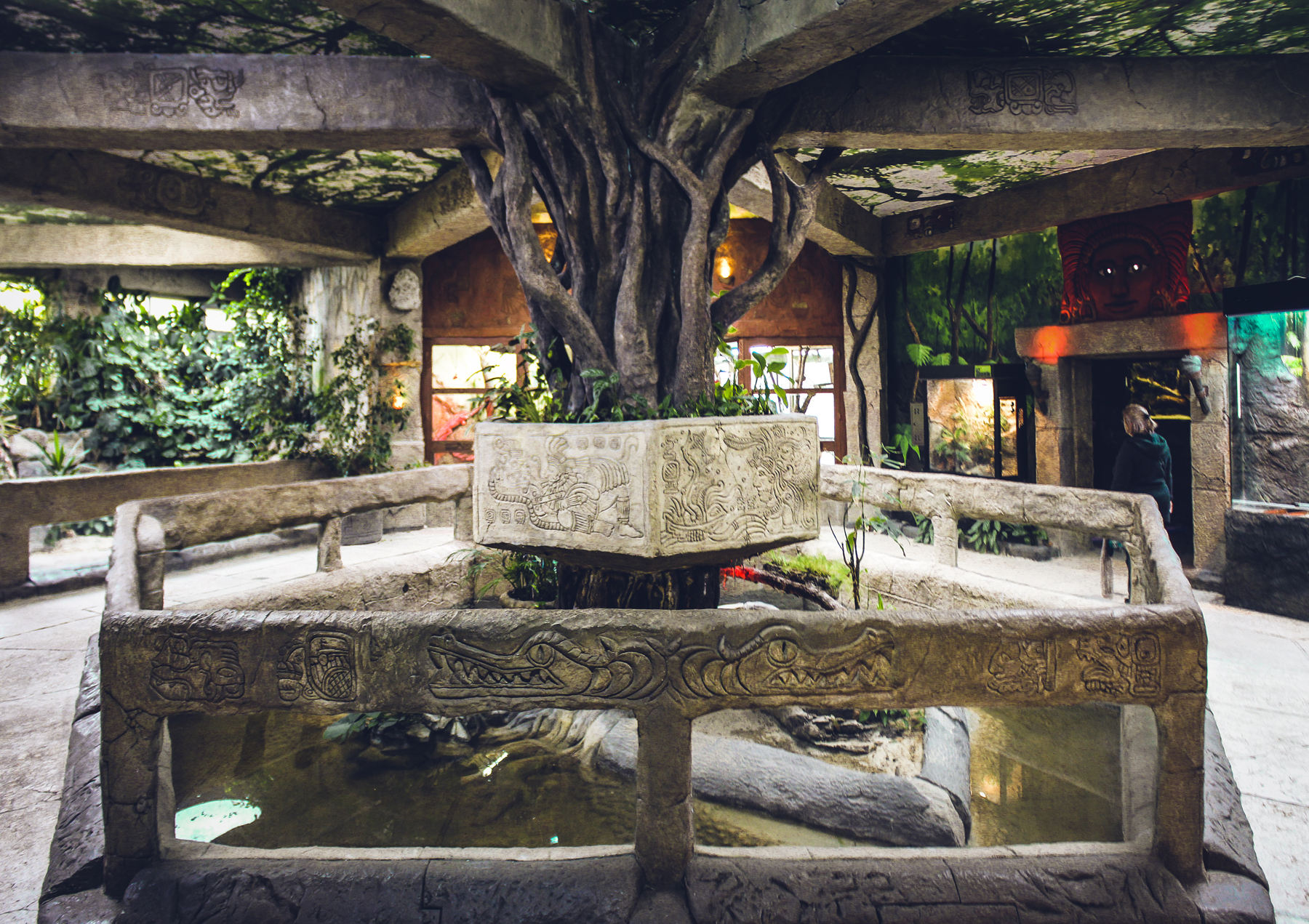

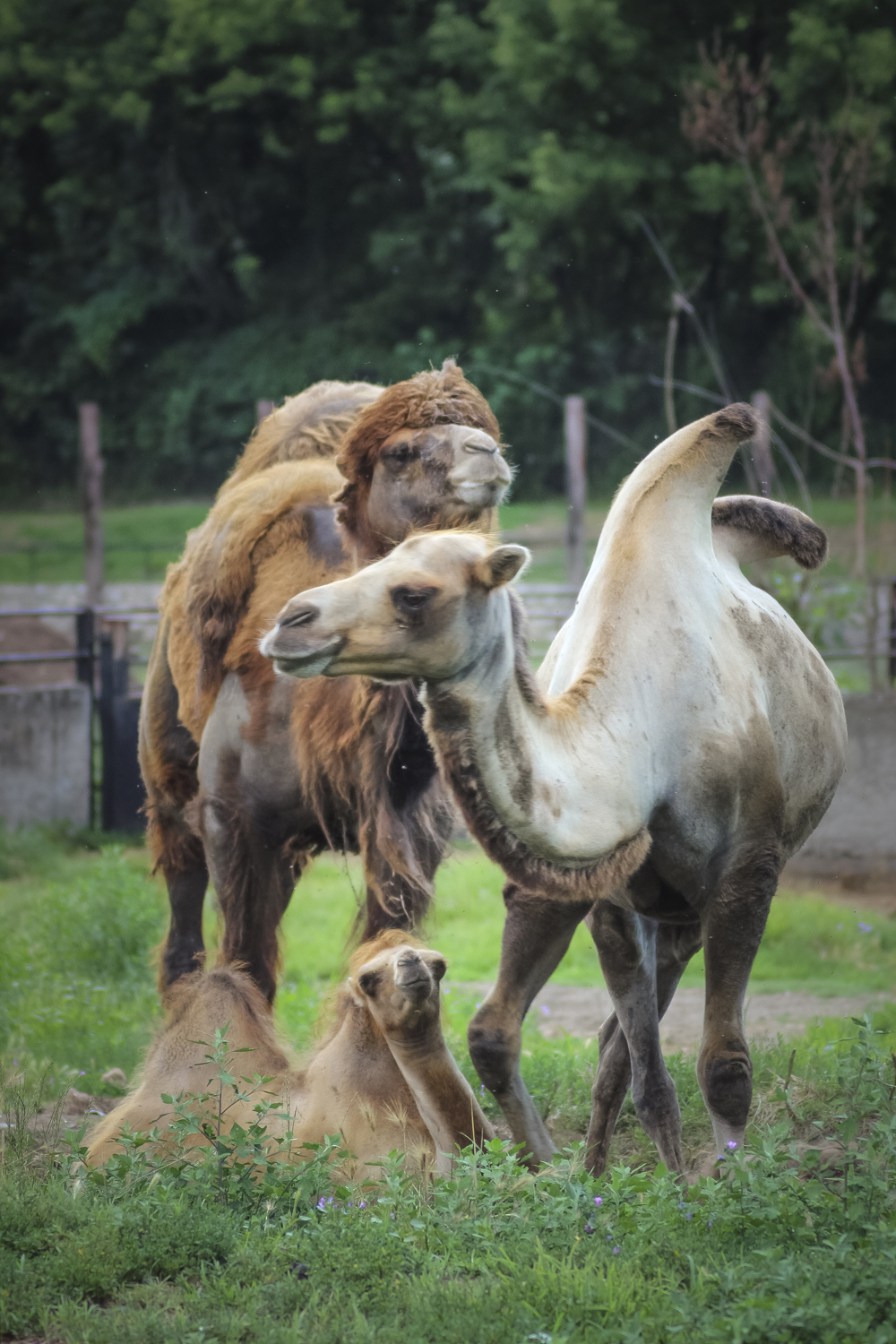

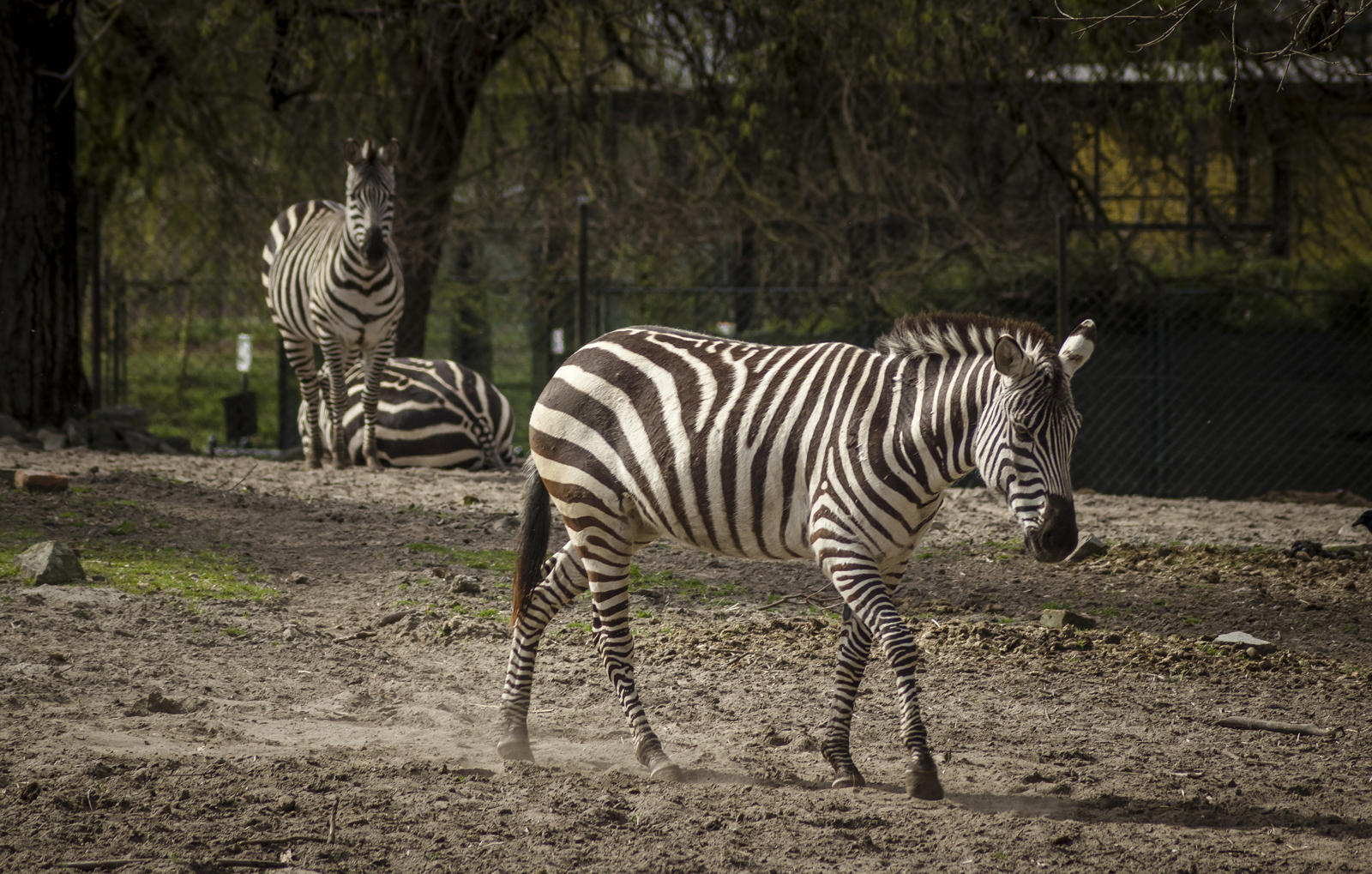

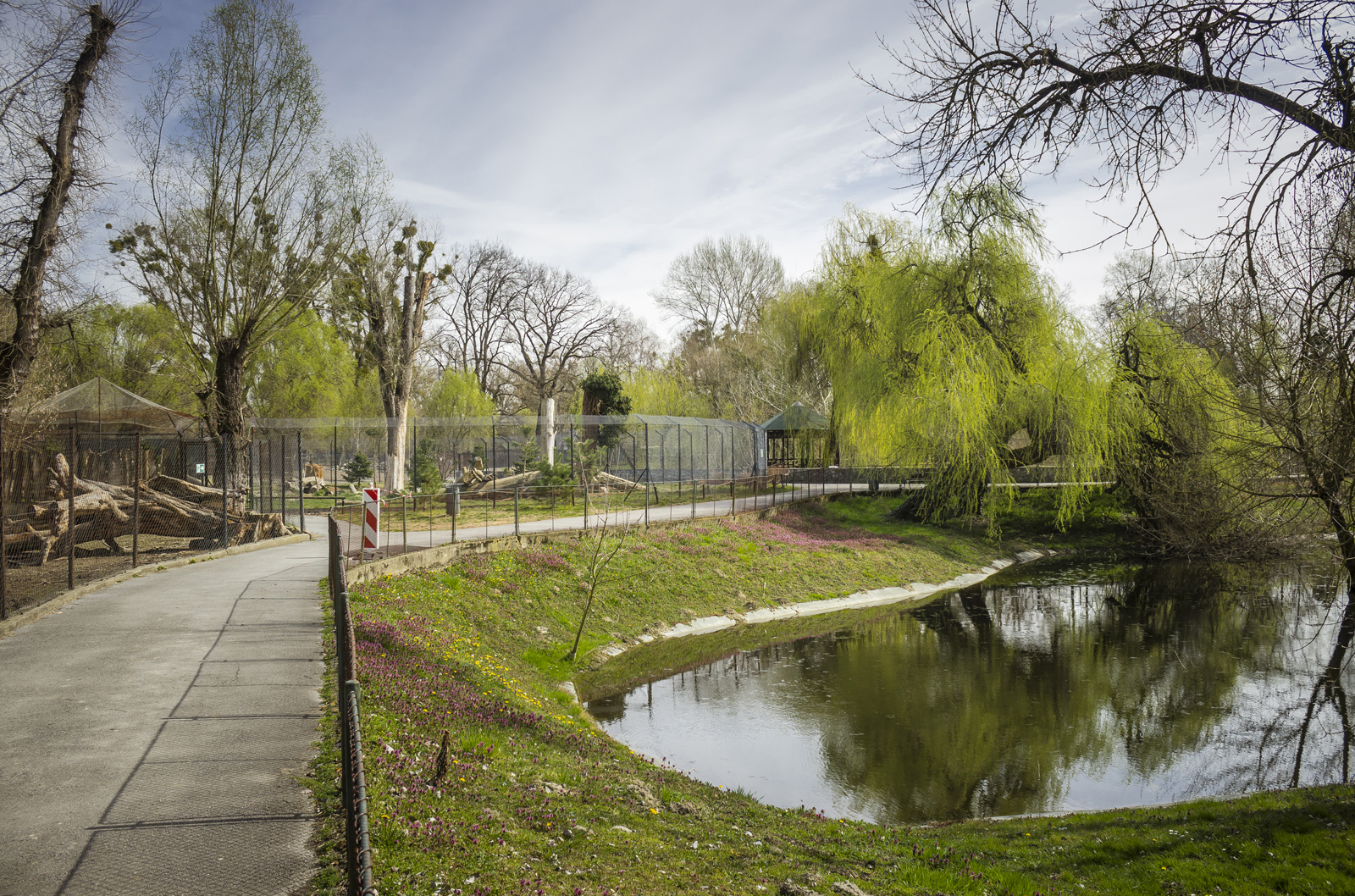

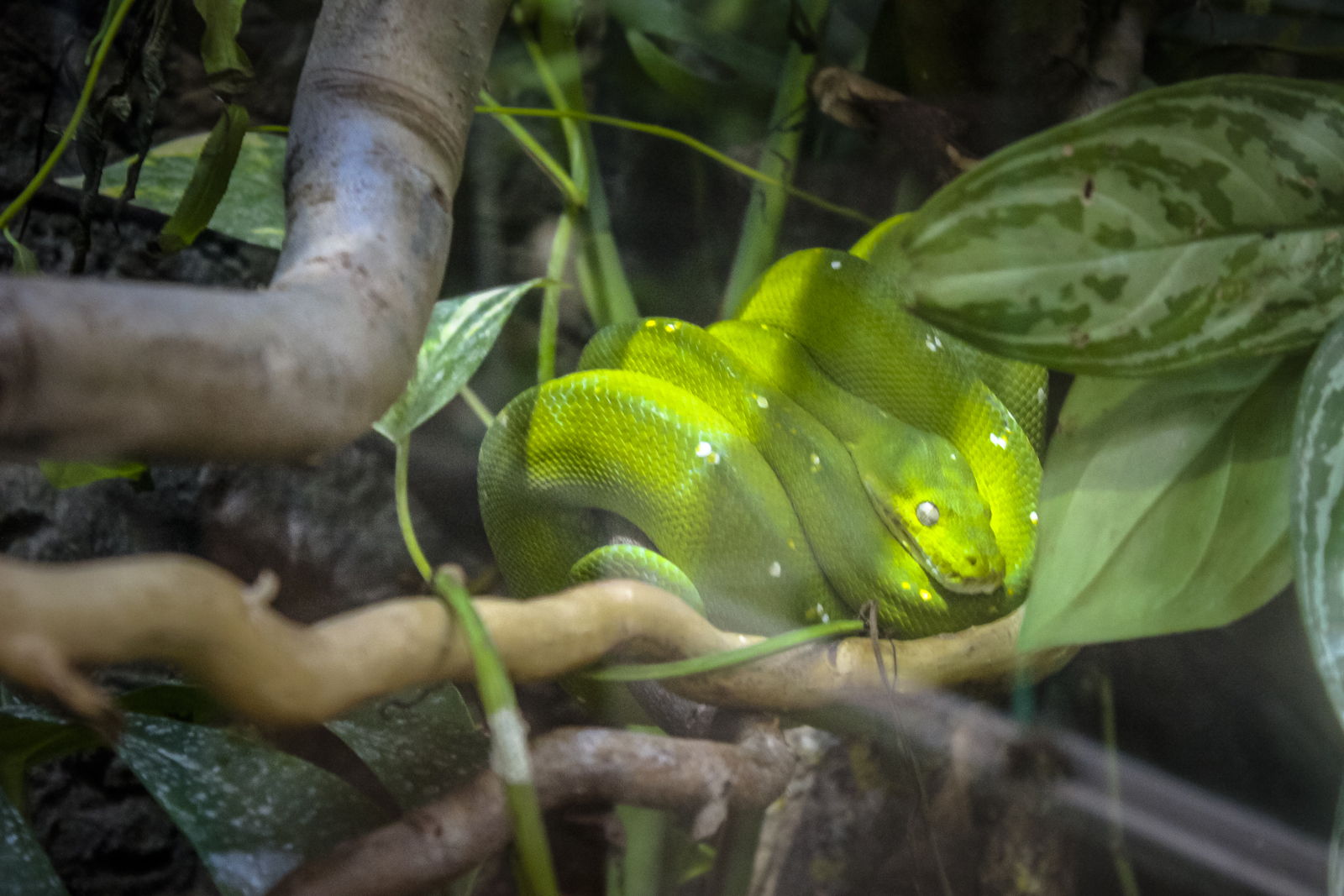

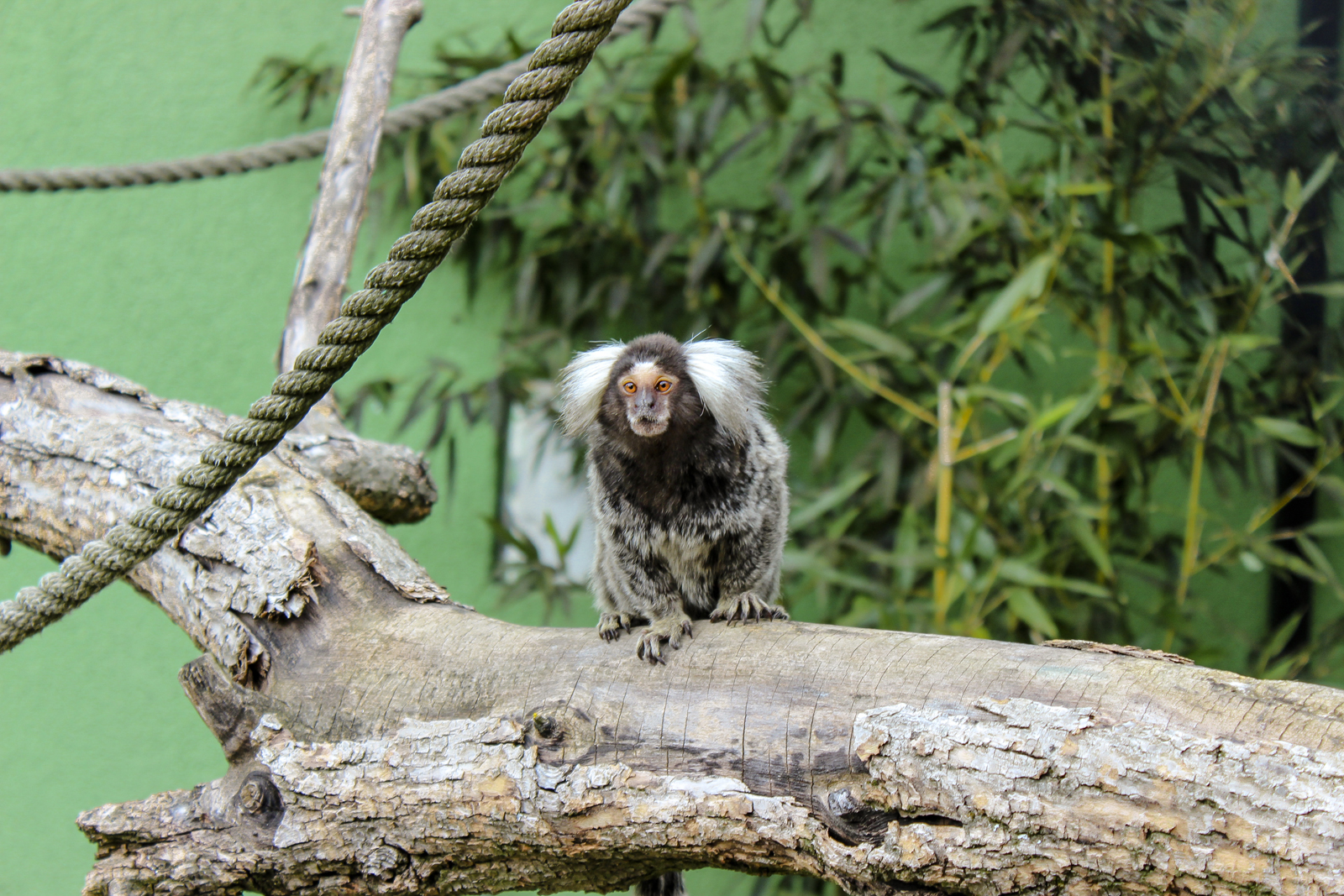

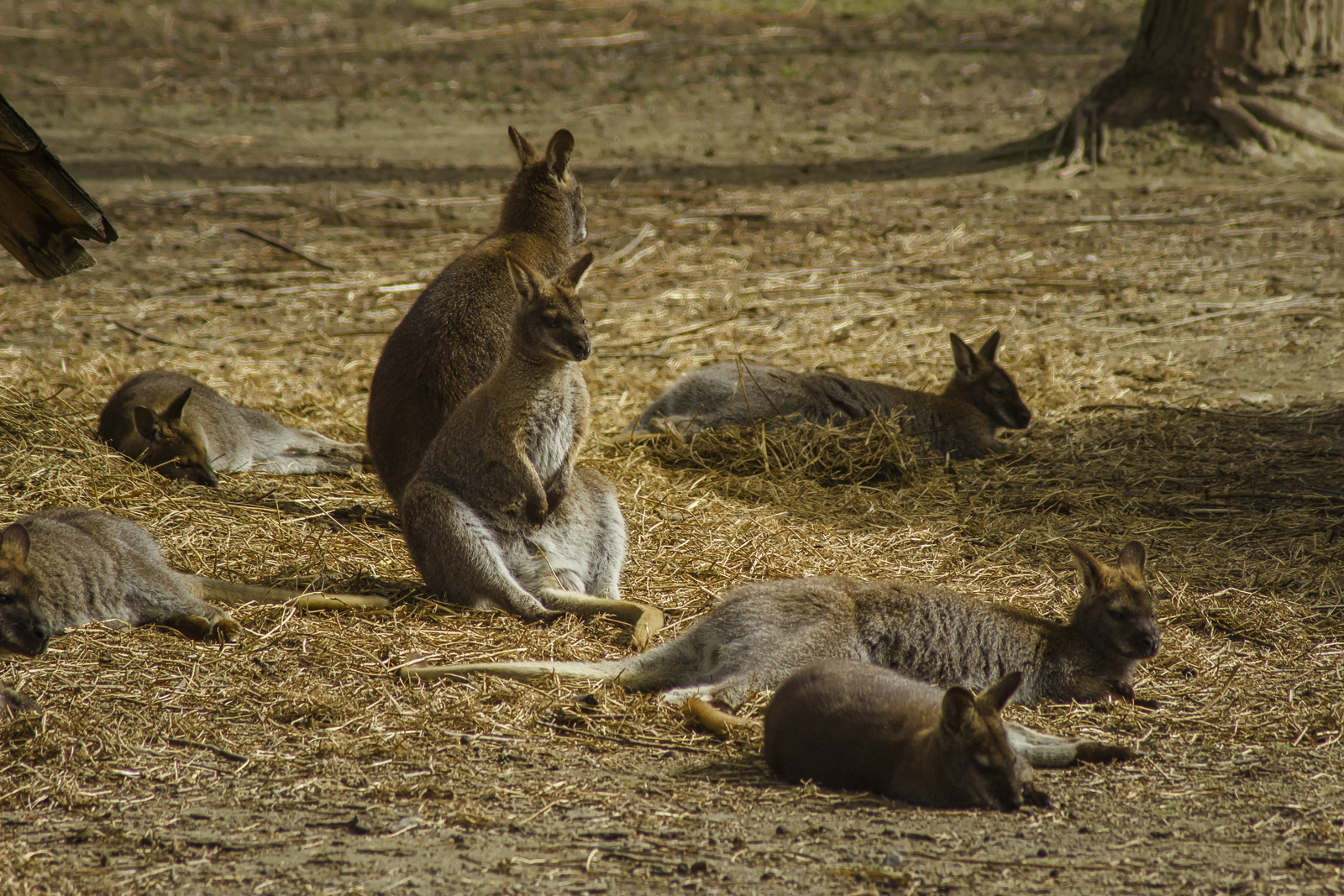

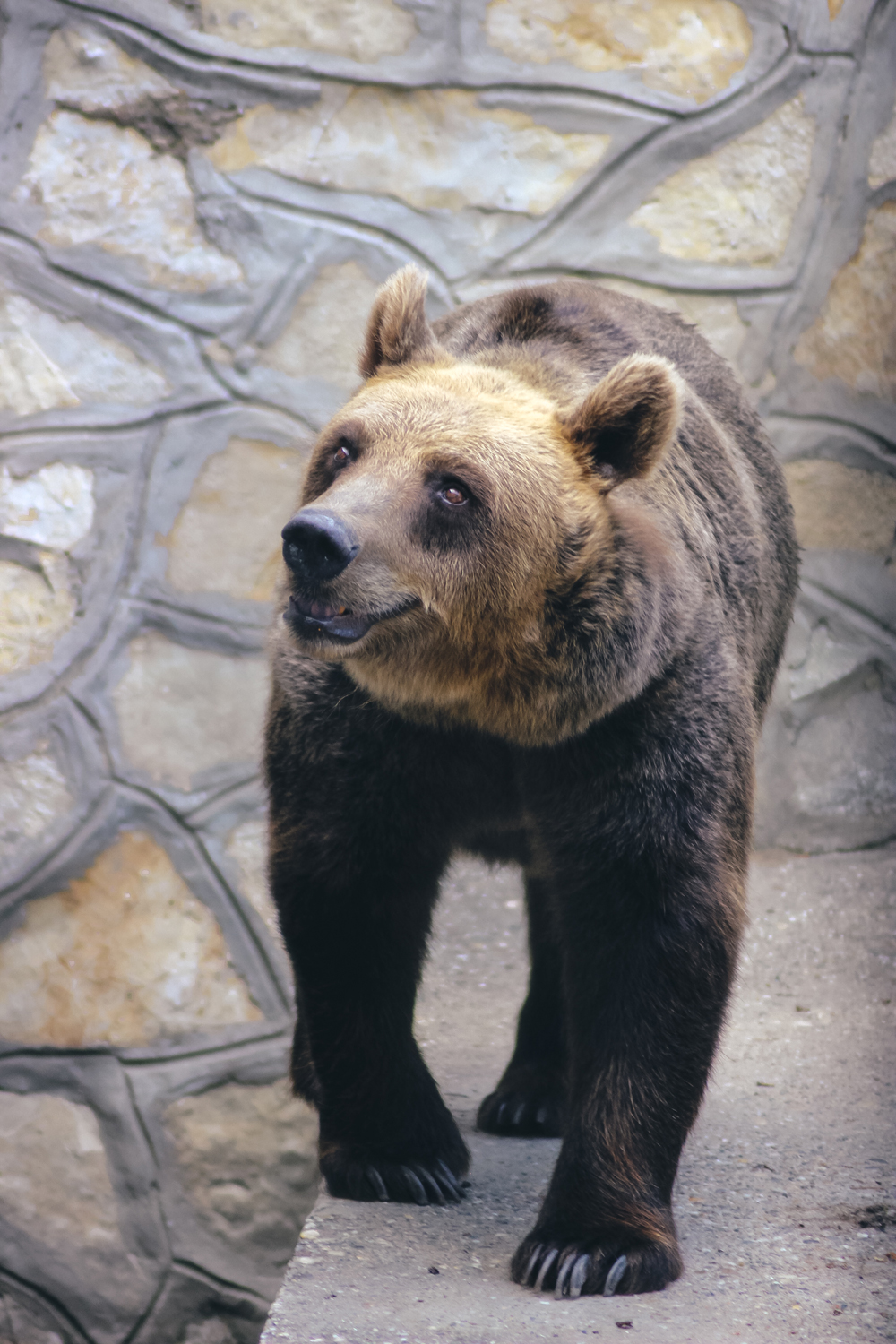

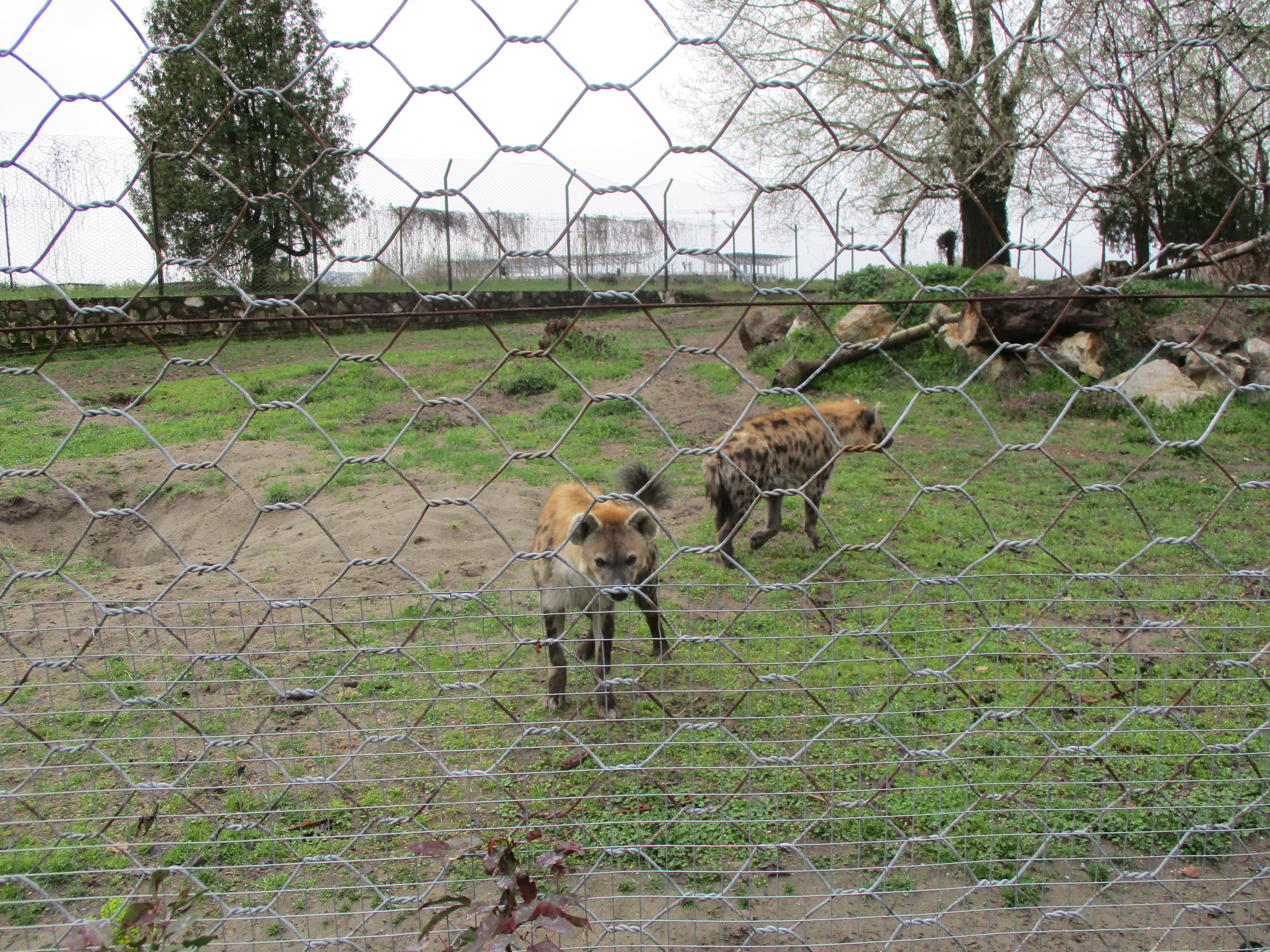
