= Mobile bleacher =

Portable stand for spectators

A mobile bleacher or portable bleacher is a type of bleacher that can be moved to different locations to fulfill a need for temporary or reconfigurable seating. Some units incorporate a built-in hydraulic or electric actuation system for raising and lowering the unit. Highway towable units are available, as well as units designed to be moved within a single venue.

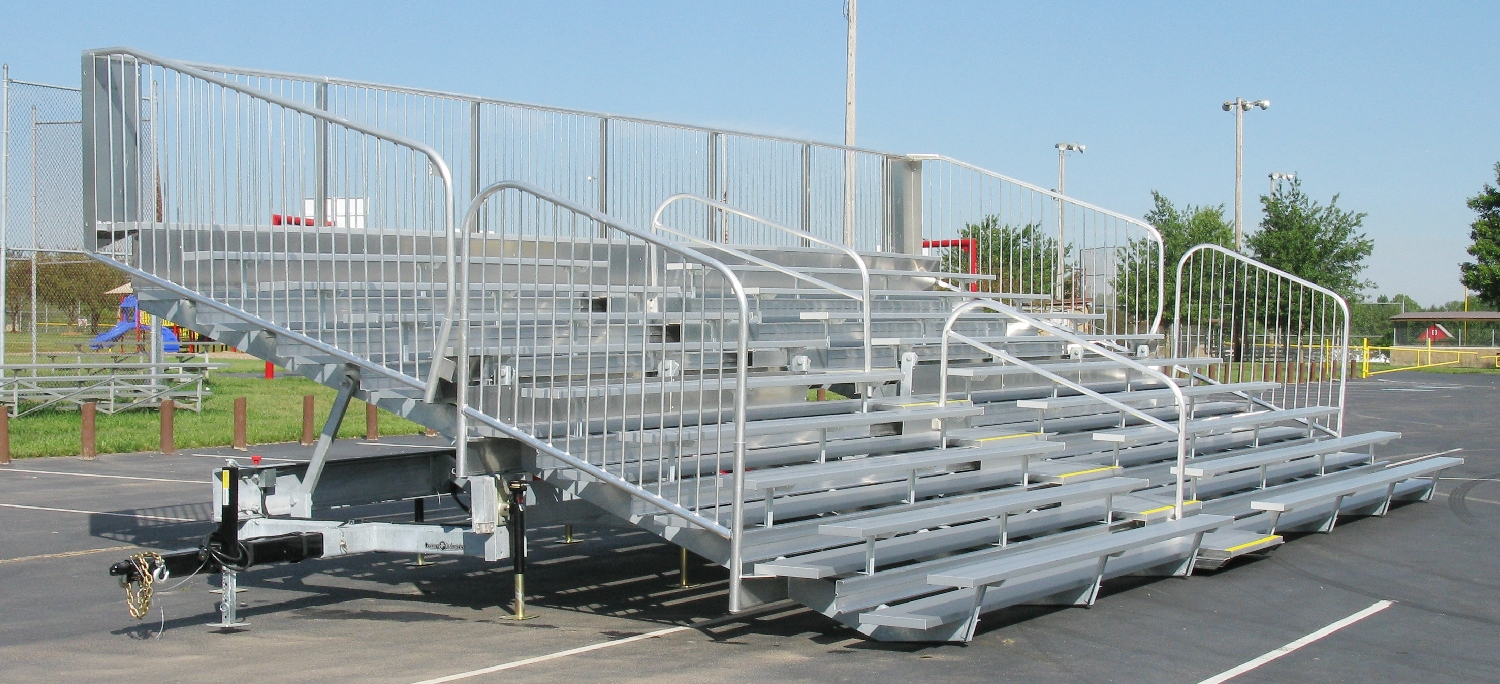
Mobile bleacher

In multi-purpose sports venues, seating arrangements must be adapted to suit different sports' requirements. In indoor arenas, the activity area may vary from the size of a boxing ring to a football pitch. In outdoor sports, field sizes may vary between American football and soccer requirements, or baseball fields. Movable seating arrangements have been created to fill this need. Mobile bleachers provide a lower-cost method of providing such seating with minimal site preparation requirements.

In the United States, mobile bleachers are required to meet the same safety standards as fixed, telescopic and temporary bleachers in accordance with CPSC Publication 330.

== See also ==
- Movable seating
