= Kaiserwald (disambiguation) =

Kaiserwald may refer to:

- Kaiserwald concentration camp, a WWII German concentration camp near Mežaparks, Latvia
- Kaiserwald Riga, a Baltic German football club
- The German name for Mežaparks, a neighbourhood in Riga, Latvia
- The German name for Mežaparks (park), an urban park in the Mežaparks neighbourhood
- The German name for Slavkovský les, a mountain range in the Czech Republic
