= 1923 Latvian Football Championship =

Latvian Football Championship
- Season: 1923
- Matches played: 30
- Goals scored: 126 (4.2 per match)
- Average goals/game: 4.2

The 1923 Latvian Football Championship of the Latvian Higher League was contested by 6 teams with Kaiserwald winning the championship.

In the first stage, province group, LNJS from Liepāja won in the tournament of best teams from Kurzeme, Zemgale, Vidzeme and Latgale regions. In the second stage, Kaiserwald (Riga) defeated LNJS [Liepaja] 4-0.

== League standings ==
Pos	Team	Pld	W	D	L	GF	GA	GD	Pts
1	Kaiserwald	10	7	2	1	44	8	+36	16
2	RFK	10	7	1	2	26	11	+15	15
3	LSB	10	5	4	1	19	11	+8	14
4	Amatieris	10	3	3	4	13	21	−8	9
5	JKS	10	1	1	8	13	28	−15	3
6	Union	10	1	1	8	11	47	−36	3

Source: rsssf.com
