= Muja (alligator) =

Oldest living alligator (hatched 1937)

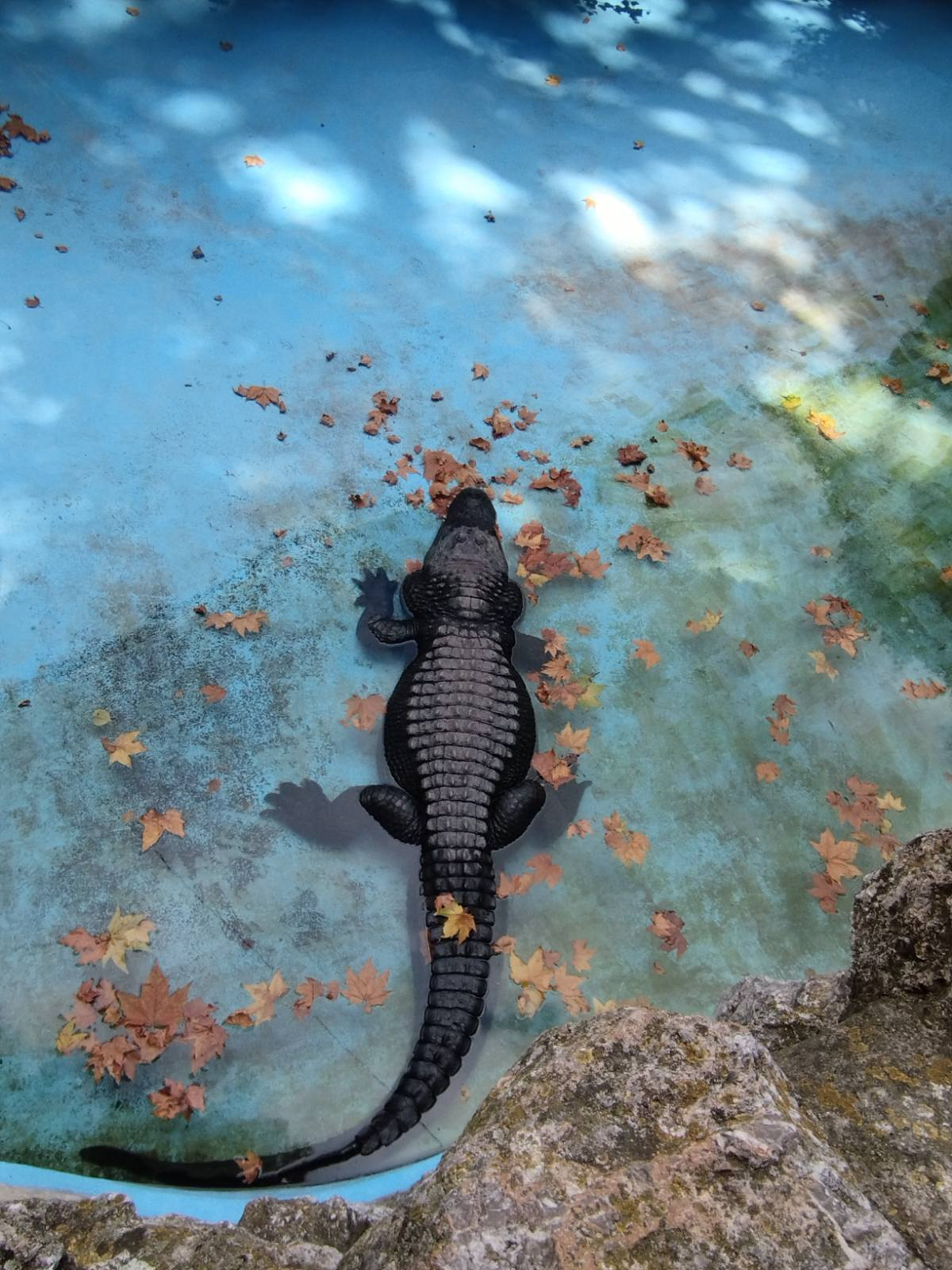
- Muja in 2023
- Species: American alligator (Alligator mississippiensis)
- Sex: Male
- Hatched: c. 1925-1935; Kingdom of Yugoslavia
- Known for: Oldest known alligator

Muja (Serbian Cyrillic: Муја; pronounced MOO-ya) (hatched c. 1925–1935) is an American alligator living in the Belgrade Zoo and is the oldest known alligator in captivity. Having arrived at the zoo in 1937, Muja has lived through both the Axis and Allied bombings of Belgrade during World War II, as well as the NATO bombing of Yugoslavia in 1999.

Following the death of Čabulītis at the Riga Zoo in Latvia in 2007, Muja was recognized as the oldest known alligator in captivity by Guinness World Records. In 2012, Muja's right foot had to be amputated after he was diagnosed with gangrene. Muja remains popular among visitors to the zoo and has gained a following on social media platforms such as TikTok.

== Life ==
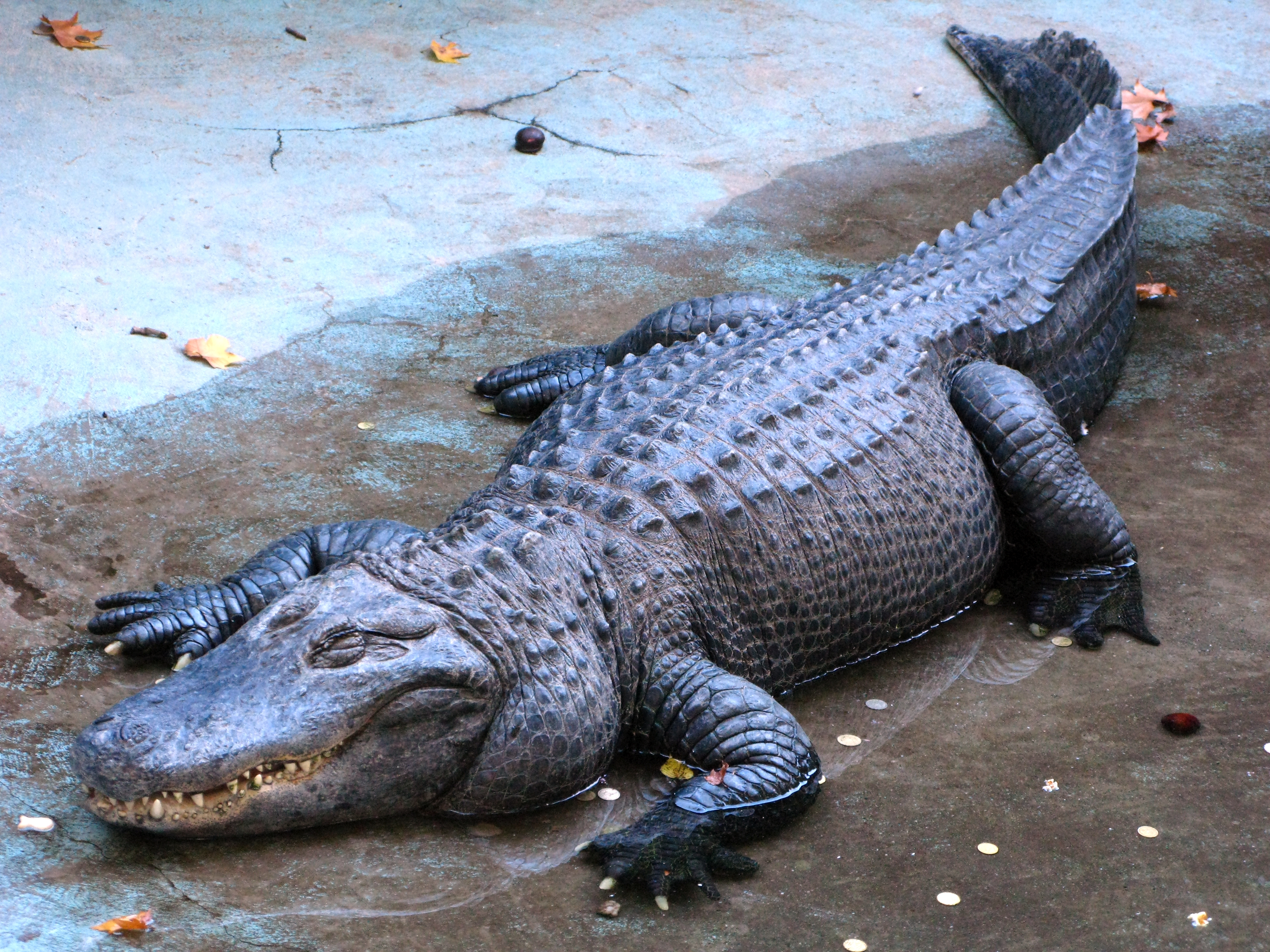
Muja in 2010

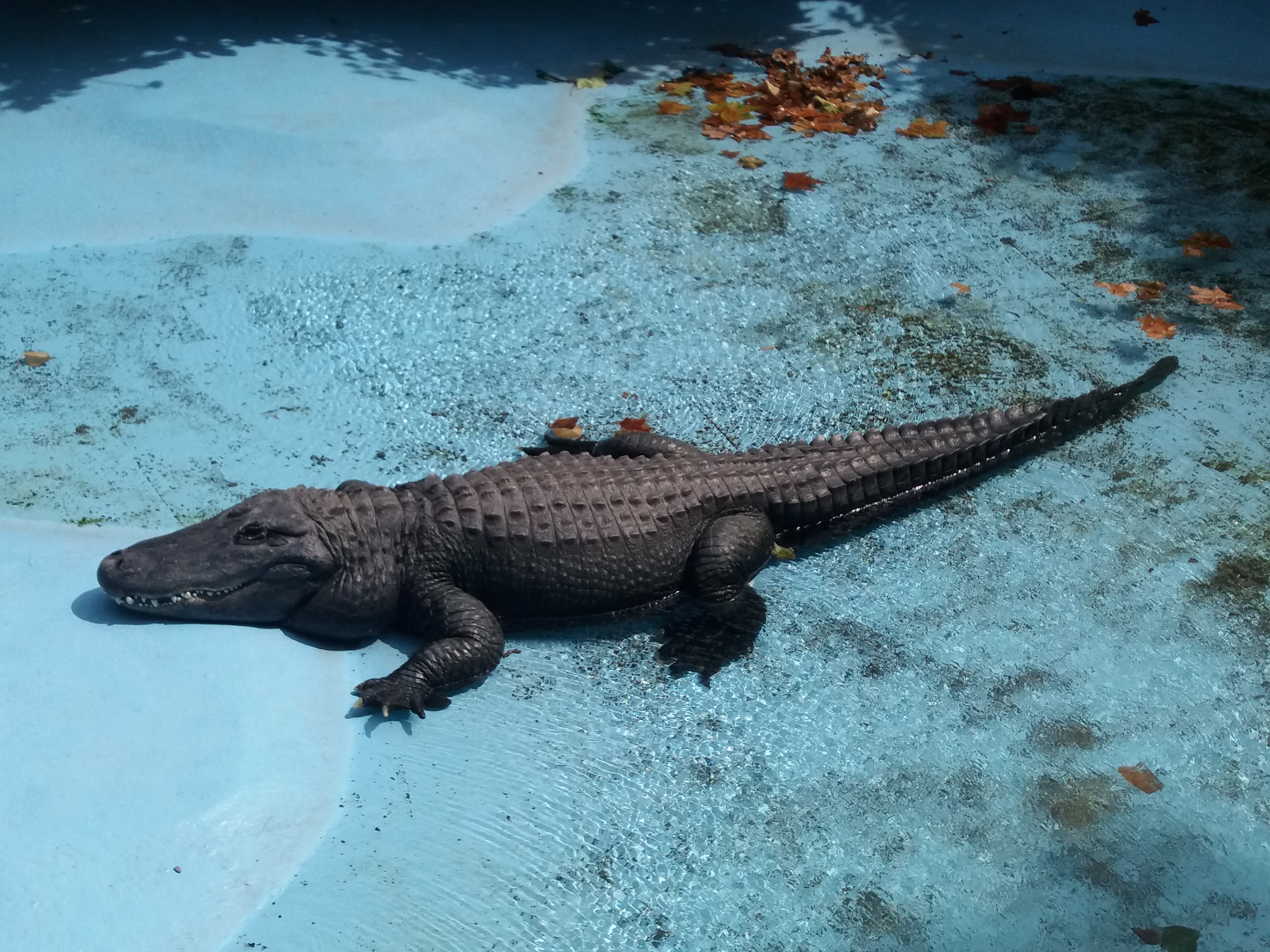
Muja in 2018

Muja is an American alligator (Alligator mississippiensis). According to the Belgrade Zoo's website, he arrived at the zoo on 9 August 1937. Guinness World Records reports the date of his arrival as 12 September 1937. Muja's age at the time of his arrival is unknown. Alligators typically grow between 3 inches (76 mm) and 8 inches (200 mm) per year after hatching, and are considered adults upon reaching a length of 1.8 metres (5 ft 11 in). It takes around 12 years on average for an alligator to become fully mature. As Muja was already fully grown in 1937, he may have been at least 10–12 years old when he arrived. Conversely, a contemporary newspaper clipping reported him as being two years old at the time of his arrival. All documentation pertaining to his acquisition was lost during World War II. Such paucity of records is not uncommon and many zoos around the world find it difficult to determine the exact age of their older alligators.

Muja survived the German bombing of Belgrade in April 1941, during the Axis invasion of Yugoslavia, in which the Belgrade Zoo was damaged. He also survived the Allied bombing of Belgrade in 1944. During the war years, the zoo was barely able to function, and its animals faced grueling winters. This resulted in the deaths of many of the zoo's animals. In 1999, Muja lived through the NATO bombing of Yugoslavia, during which buildings located within several blocks of the Belgrade Zoo were destroyed.

The average lifespan of an American alligator is between 35 and 50 years. By some accounts, Muja became the oldest known alligator in captivity in 2007, when Čabulītis died at the Riga Zoo in Latvia. Other sources suggest Muja became the world's oldest alligator in May 2020, following the death of Saturn in the Moscow Zoo. Muja is the Belgrade Zoo's last surviving animal from the 1930s and 1940s. He is widely regarded as the oldest living alligator in captivity and has been recognized as such by Guinness World Records. However, it is not uncommon for alligators in captivity to live more than 70 years.

== Health and lifestyle ==
Muja spends the summers in a pond and winters in a special chamber, which was renovated in 2016 to resemble a cave. He is fed once a week and usually eats 5–6 kilograms (11–13 lb) of meat. His diet consists of skinned rats, rabbits, bird, horse meat and beef. He eats this together with bones, which are good for his teeth and calcium levels. Due to his old age, it is difficult for him to hunt for his food, and zookeepers instead place it right in front of his jaw. Unless he is being prodded or fed, Muja is usually motionless, leading some visitors to inquire whether he is alive. According to the zoo's veterinarian, Jožef Ezveđ, Muja has a good degree of mobility for an alligator his age.

In February 2012, zookeepers noticed that Muja seemed to be experiencing discomfort in his right foreleg. A team led by veterinary surgeon Srećko Radojičić subsequently diagnosed Muja with gangrene and judged that the only way to prolong his life would be to amputate the leg. The team had only 48 hours to prepare for the surgery. Prior to the amputation, Muja was given local anesthesia and tied down to the operating table. The procedure lasted three hours, and according to zookeeper Aleksandar Rakočević, was done using local anesthesia. Muja was given antibiotics before and after the procedure. "The very next day after the surgery he started eating," Rakočević said. "Every time he eats it is a sign of his recovery." Afterwards, Muja was separated from a group of three young alligators that had arrived to the zoo from Cuba.

Muja's longevity has attracted the attention of social media users and the alligator has become popular on social media platforms such as TikTok.

== See also ==
- Gabi (dog)
- Sami (chimpanzee)
- Saturn (alligator)
- Čabulītis
