= Čabulītis =

Alligator who lived at the Riga Zoo (1935-2007)

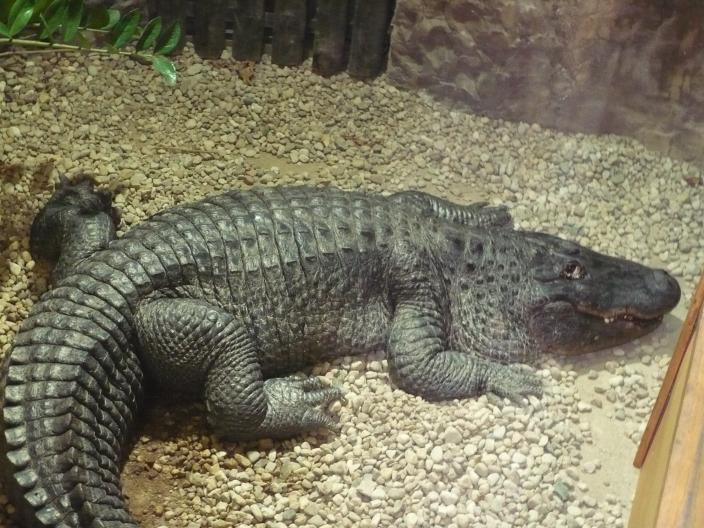
- Čabulītis in June 2007
- Species: American Alligator
- Sex: Male
- Hatched: before 1935
- Died: August 21, 2007 (aged 71–72); Riga, Latvia
- Known for: One of the oldest captive alligators in Europe

Čabulītis (fl. 1935 – 21 August 2007) was a captive American alligator residing at the Riga Zoo in Riga, Latvia. At the time of his death, he was thought to be one of the oldest captive alligators in Europe. Information at the Riga Zoo, dated 1 April 1935, suggests that he was 1 to 3 years old on arrival.

== Physical characteristics and diet ==
He was 2.9 metres (9 ft 6 in) long and weighed 140 kilograms (310 lb). In 1958, 1970, and 1980, due to problems with heating of the crocodile house, Čabulītis would not consume food for periods of 5 to 7 months. Otherwise he normally ate about 1.5 kilograms (3.3 lb) of beef twice a week in addition to chicken once a week. He also liked herring, but refused to eat furry or live animals.

== Biography ==
In Latvian, Čabulītis roughly translates to sweet and tender creature. At various times, the alligator was also known by the names Ulmanītis, Ali, and Gena. Three other alligators about the same age lived at the zoo in the 1930s – two females and a male. The other male was moved to the Kyiv Zoo in 1965. Both females were euthanized in the 1970s due to illnesses caused by injuries sustained in fights. Since that time, Čabulītis was the only alligator in the zoo.

In the 1980s an American crocodile, Balodītis (i.e., little dove), was housed in a room next to Čabulītis. (The ranges of the two species do overlap in the wild part of Florida.) Balodītis once managed to get into Čabulītis' room by climbing over the wall at night. As they didn't fight, Balodītis was allowed to share space until Čabulītis grew more aggressive and the reptiles were separated again.

Čabulītis enjoyed being sprayed with warm water, having his back brushed, and he would roar when he heard the music of German pop duo Modern Talking. In the last ten years of his life, Čabulītis lost an increasing number of teeth and his movements became slower, causing visitors to wonder if the alligator was even alive. He spent a lot of time in the water as it became difficult for him to walk on dry land. Čabulītis died of lung disease and heart failure. A memorial was planned for Čabulītis, and his remains were stuffed and exhibited in the zoo along with his skeleton.

== See also ==
- Muja, oldest living alligator in the world, living in the Belgrade Zoo, Serbia
- Saturn, alligator taken to Moscow after WWII from the Berlin Zoo (died on 22 May 2020)
