= Latvian Architecture Award =

Annual national architecture award in Latvia

- Native name: Latvijas Arhitektūras gada balva
- Awarded for: Achievements in Latvian architecture
- Country: Latvia
- Presented by: Latvian Association of Architects
- First award: 1995
- Website: www.latarh.lv/annual-award/about

The Latvian Architecture Award (Latvian: Latvijas Arhitektūras gada balva; LAGB) is an annual national architecture award in Latvia. It has been presented since 1995 and is organised by the Latvian Association of Architects with support from Latvia's Ministry of Culture. The organisers describe it as the highest recognition in Latvian architecture and a nationally significant event, while Latvian Public Media has called it the biggest event of the Latvian architectural year. The award marked its 30th anniversary in 2025. It is separate from the Riga Architecture Award, a municipal prize organised by the Riga City Architect's Office.

== Format and evaluation ==
Eligible entries include works realised in Latvia regardless of their authors' nationality, as well as works realised elsewhere when the authors' country of affiliation is Latvia. Entries are divided into two broad types: objects, meaning completed works that have been put into use, and processes, which may include research, publications, educational projects and other events connected with architecture.

The competition is conducted in two rounds. A national jury evaluates the submissions and selects finalists, after which an international jury chooses the laureates. The 2026 regulations define the principal distinctions as the Grand Prix and the Annual Award, also called the Silver Award. Additional distinctions have included a public-choice award. The children's-jury award Zirnis has also been presented.

== Public programme and development ==
The award is accompanied by activities intended to bring contemporary architecture to a wider audience. In 2016, Architecture Week included a public exhibition of 16 semifinalists, short films and lectures by architects.

In 2024, 54 works were submitted, including 47 objects and seven processes. An open-air exhibition in Old Riga presented the 16 finalists with bilingual descriptions and jury comments; FOLD described the exhibition as an annual public tradition. In 2025, the national jury selected 15 finalists from 48 submissions before the international-jury stage.

A 2024 study by Chi-Hui Chen, Uģis Bratuškins and Sandra Treija analysed Grand Prix-winning works from 1995 to 2024 using the Davos Baukultur Quality System. The authors found that early discussion focused chiefly on functionality and aesthetics, while later projects placed increasing emphasis on sustainability, cultural identity and social inclusion.

== Main award recipients since 2015 ==
Year	Main award recipient(s)	Location	Source
2015	Restoration of Rundāle Palace; National Library of Latvia	Rundāle; Riga	
2016	Reconstruction and extension of the Latvian National Museum of Art	Riga	
2017	Shaolin Flying Monks Theatre, by Mailītis Architects	China	
2018	Renovation of Liepāja State Gymnasium No. 1, by Ilze Mekša and Wonderfull	Liepāja	
2019	Salt House, by Brigita Bula and Brigita Bula arhitekti	Pāvilosta	
2020	Reconstruction of buildings on Miesnieku Street, by ARHIS Arhitekti	Riga	
2021	Reconstruction of the Mežaparks Great Bandstand	Riga	
2022	Pērle social support centre, by ĒTER	Cēsis	
2023	Forecourt of the Daile Theatre, by MADE arhitekti	Riga	
2024	Reconstruction of the New Riga Theatre, by Zaigas Gailes Birojs and Sarma & Norde Architects	Riga	
2025	Salaspils 7 preschool, a wooden kindergarten by MADE arhitekti	Salaspils	
