= Mežaparks Great Bandstand =

Open-air concert venue in Mežaparks, Riga, Latvia

Coordinates: 57°0′56.30″N 24°9′4.19″E

The Great Bandstand designed by Mailītis Architects

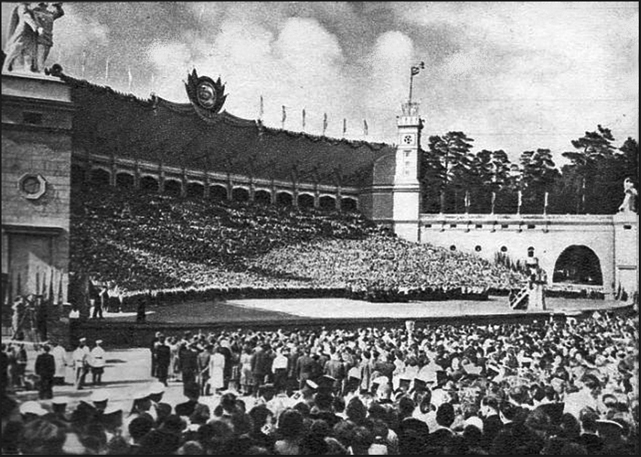
Mežaparks Great Bandstand in 1955

The Mežaparks Great Bandstand (Latvian: Mežaparka Lielā estrāde), also called the Song Festival Bandstand, Open-Air Stage (Latvian: Dziesmu svētku estrāde), is a large open-air bandstand in Mežaparks park in the Mežaparks neighbourhood of Riga, the capital of Latvia. The bandstand has added cultural value to Riga since 1955, when the Latvian Song and Dance Festival was moved to this venue. From 2018 to 2021, the bandstand was fully rebuilt.

The original bandstand was erected in 1954-1955 according to a project by Russian-born architect and civil engineer Vladimirs Šņitņikovs (Vladimir Shnitnikov). It lies in the northern part of Mežaparks, an area that mostly consists of pine forest. Within the cleared area of the forest, the bandstand lies in the northwestern corner, and the rest of the area has long wingshaped benches with seating for 30,000 spectators.

The stage is an integral part of the Song and Dance Festival which is a unique feature of Latvian culture and a part of national identity. The key function of an open air stage is to keep the tradition of the Song Festival, which is included in the UNESCO Representative List of the Intangible Cultural Heritage of Humanity.

The bandstand is managed by the Culture Association of Northern Riga of the Riga City Council.

== Reconstruction ==
The Mežaparks Great Bandstand, as seen from the choir area, after the reconstruction

Side view from the choir area

In mid-2007 Riga City Council announced a new – international – design competition. The competitors were expected to produce rational, structurally innovative and acoustically impeccable proposals for transformation of the stage what would include the roof with a system of acoustic elements, partial transformation of chorister stands, transformation of the spectator amphitheatre, construction of new stands at the rear part of the amphitheatre and installation of transformable spectator bench systems.

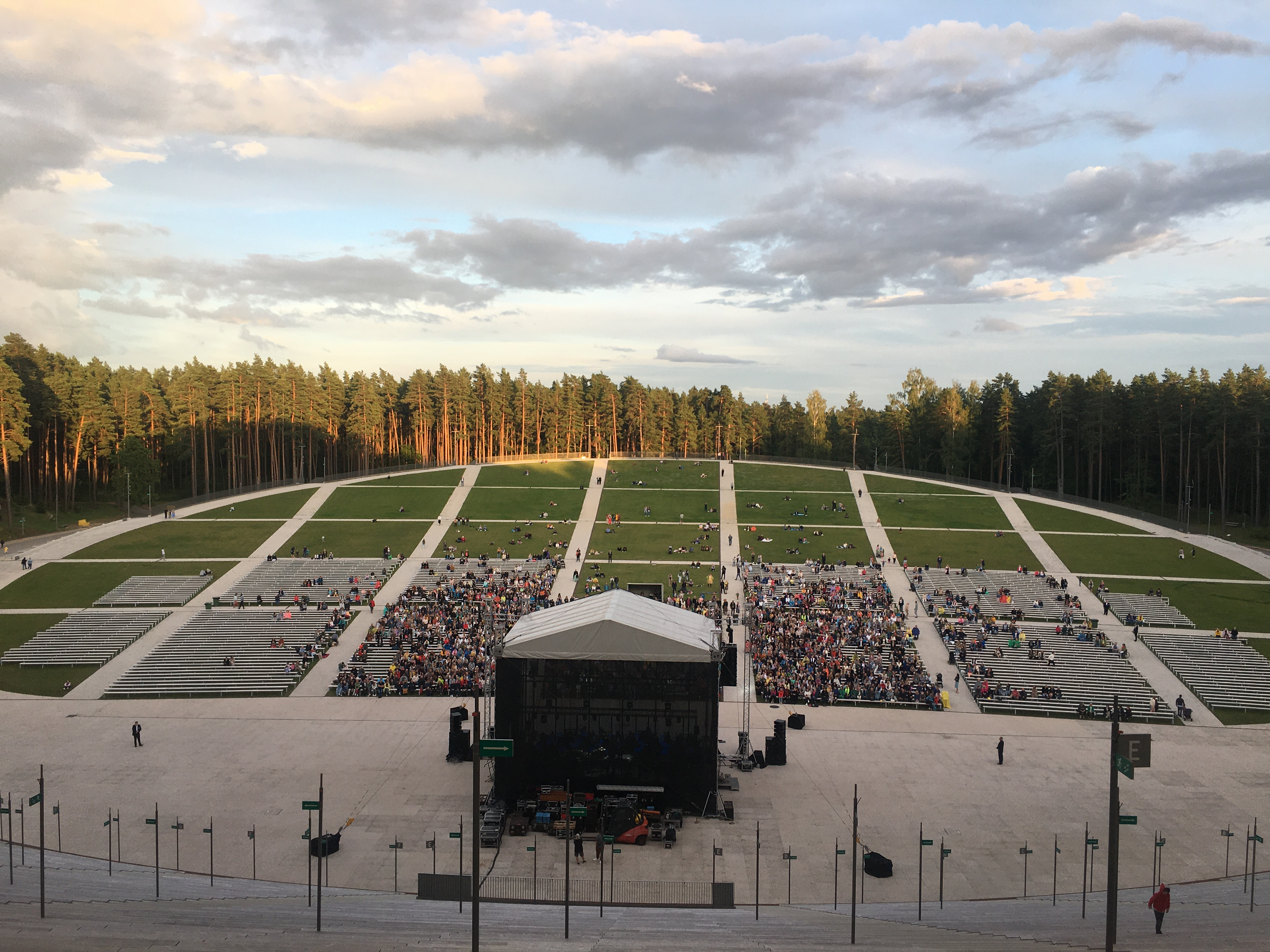
View from Mežaparks Great Bandstand during Melo-M concert in 2022

The winner of the International Sketch Competition for the Mežaparks Open-Air Stage Reconstruction were the Latvian Architects collaborative team - Mailītis Architects and Juris Poga's Bureau with the project Sudraba birzs ('Silver Grove').

The Project reconstruction has been divided into two phases:

The first phase of the Open-Air Stage in Mežaparks reconstruction project involves reconstruction of the audience area for the 2018 Latvian Song and Dance Festival with audience field extension to 30,557 seats (23,000 seats before). Transformable audience field increased the capacity to 60,000 standing places. There is a two-level open zone for shops, restaurants and toilets under the audience area. The first phase of the project extends the existing building stage structure and partly attaches a temporary tribune for extra singers to fit 14,000 singers.

The first reconstruction phase was officially completed in June 2018.

The second reconstruction round rebuilt the all open-air stage and its roof. Auxiliary premises were built under the stage, including an exhibition hall to showcase the history of the Song and Dance Festival, conference rooms and offices. The project was scheduled to be completed before 2023 when the 150th anniversary of the Latvian Song and Dance Festival took place in Mežaparks. The project included unique acoustic methods – 300 acoustic shields on the ceiling, and a special membrane protecting singers from the sun and rain. The capacity of the complex grew to 30,000 spectator seats after the completion of the project, with the total number of singers that the stage could accommodate increasing up to 14,000, from which 11,000 were positioned in the stands and 2,900 on the main stage below.

The new, fully rebuilt Mežaparks Great Bandstand was officially unveiled on 21 June 2021. The architecture firms of Austra Mailītis and Juris Poga were awarded the 2021 Latvian Architecture Award for their contributions to the reconstruction project.

A new bandstand complex pavilion was fully opened on 5 May 2022.

== Other events ==
British pop singer Robbie Williams performed at the bandstand on August 3, 2025 as part of his Britpop Tour. A planned tour concert for American rapper Pitbull, scheduled for 29 July 2026, was cancelled on the previous evening due to safety concerns that originated while the stage of the concert on the ground level area was in the process of assembly.
