= Mežaparks (park) =

Urban park in Riga, Latvia

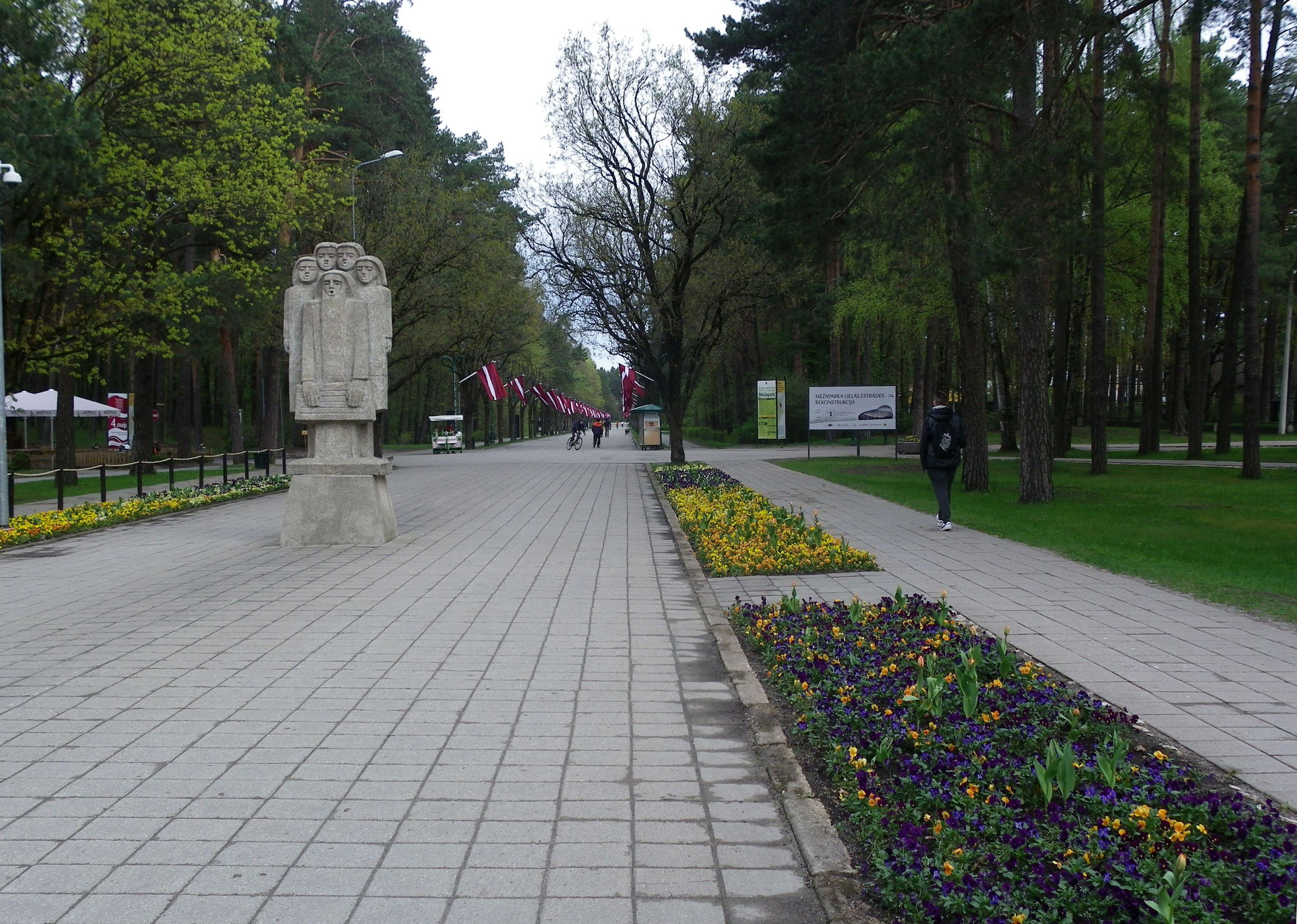
- Park entrance pedestrian street
- Interactive map of Mežaparks
- Type: Urban park
- Location: Riga, Latvia
- Coordinates: 57°00′39″N 24°08′40″E
- Area: 424 ha (1,047.73 acres)
- Established: 20 July 1949
- Operator: SIA "Rīgas meži"
- Designation: National heritage site

Mežaparks (lit. transl. Forest Park) is a large urban park in the Mežaparks neighbourhood of Riga, the capital of Latvia. The park is home to the open-air Mežaparks Great Bandstand and has Riga Zoo located next to it as well as access to Ķīšezers lake. The 424 ha (1,048 acres) territory is covered with coastal dunes, much of it with boreal forests, both protected conserved biotopes. The territory began to be used for recreation in the 18th century and was added to Riga's territory in the 19th century. In 1901, the Mežaparks neighbourhood became Russian Empire's first architectural project to use the garden city movement. The area was expanded and developed during the first half of the 20th century, primarily serving as an elite sports complex. After World War II in 1949, the Soviet Government carried out a major expansion of the park and inaugurated it as a public park with many recreational areas and buildings. Up until the end of the 20th century, the park continued to serve as a public park. Although little of the Soviet architecture survives, the park has seen a resurgence after restoration of Latvia's independence and is currently a popular recreational location. The park and the neighbourhood are a national heritage site and architectural cultural monuments.

== Overview ==
Mežaparks is a situated in the North-Eastern part of Riga., which itself is in Rīgavas līdzenums (Rigava plain) in lv:Piejūras zemiene (Seaside lowland). It is part of the Mežaparks neighbourhood of the same name.

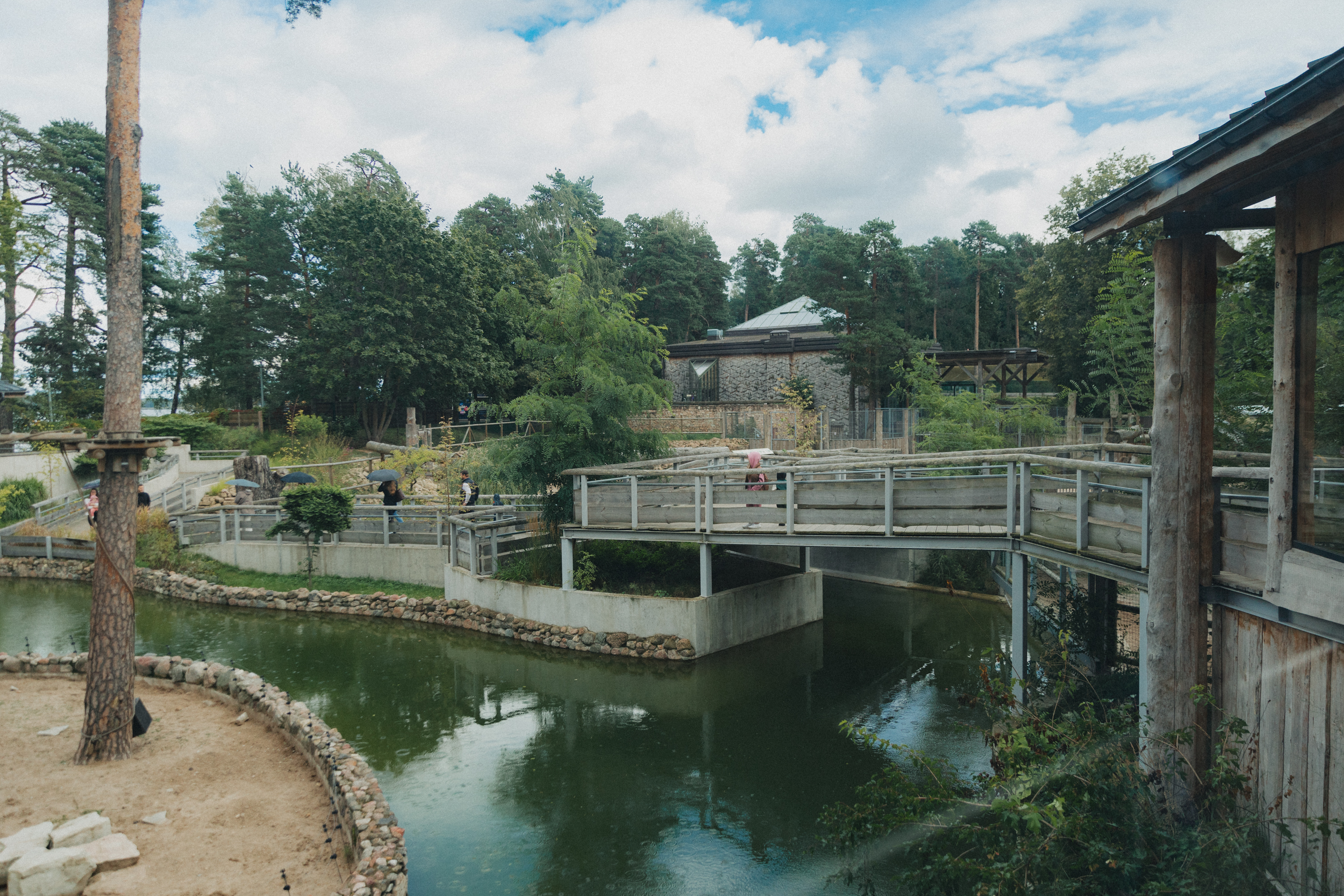
Riga Zoo

It is located next to Ķīšezers lake, has Riga Zoo adjacent to it, and is surrounded by primarily residential areas. The park's area is 424 hectares (1,048 acres), of which 380 ha (939 acres) are classified as natural landscape, 33 ha (82 acres) as constructions with greenery (including the Riga Zoo and Great Bandstand) and 2 ha (5 acres) as various constructions.

The park is freely-accessible to public and a place for various activities, recreation as well as active sports, including during winter. The park is criss-crossed with asphalted pathways and pedestrian streets. A historic open-air Green Theater is located here, originally built in the park's central part in 1949, dismantled in the 1980s, and restored in 2003. The park is adjacent on the East side to the Ķīšezers lake, which is the 10th biggest lake in Latvia covering an area of 17.3 square kilometres (6.7 sq mi). There is a small beach with amenities and small boat piers next to the lake. There are various other recreational objects, such as one of the country's biggest playgrounds, children's adventure park, BMX track, disc golf square, minigolf complex, and others. There is also an amusement park.

The biggest and best-known national-significance cultural object in the park is the Mežaparks Great Bandstand designed by architects V. Šņitņikova, G. Irbīte, K. Dannenhirša; later reconstructed in 1990. Further reconstruction has been planned since 2008 with the first stage completed in 2018 and second planned for 2023. Since 1955, the bandstand has served as the traditional place for the Latvian Song and Dance Festival.

In 1998, the park was designated as a local cultural monument and a national heritage site. Since 2016, the neighbourhood and park are jointly designated as a national architectural cultural monument.

== Geology and ecology ==
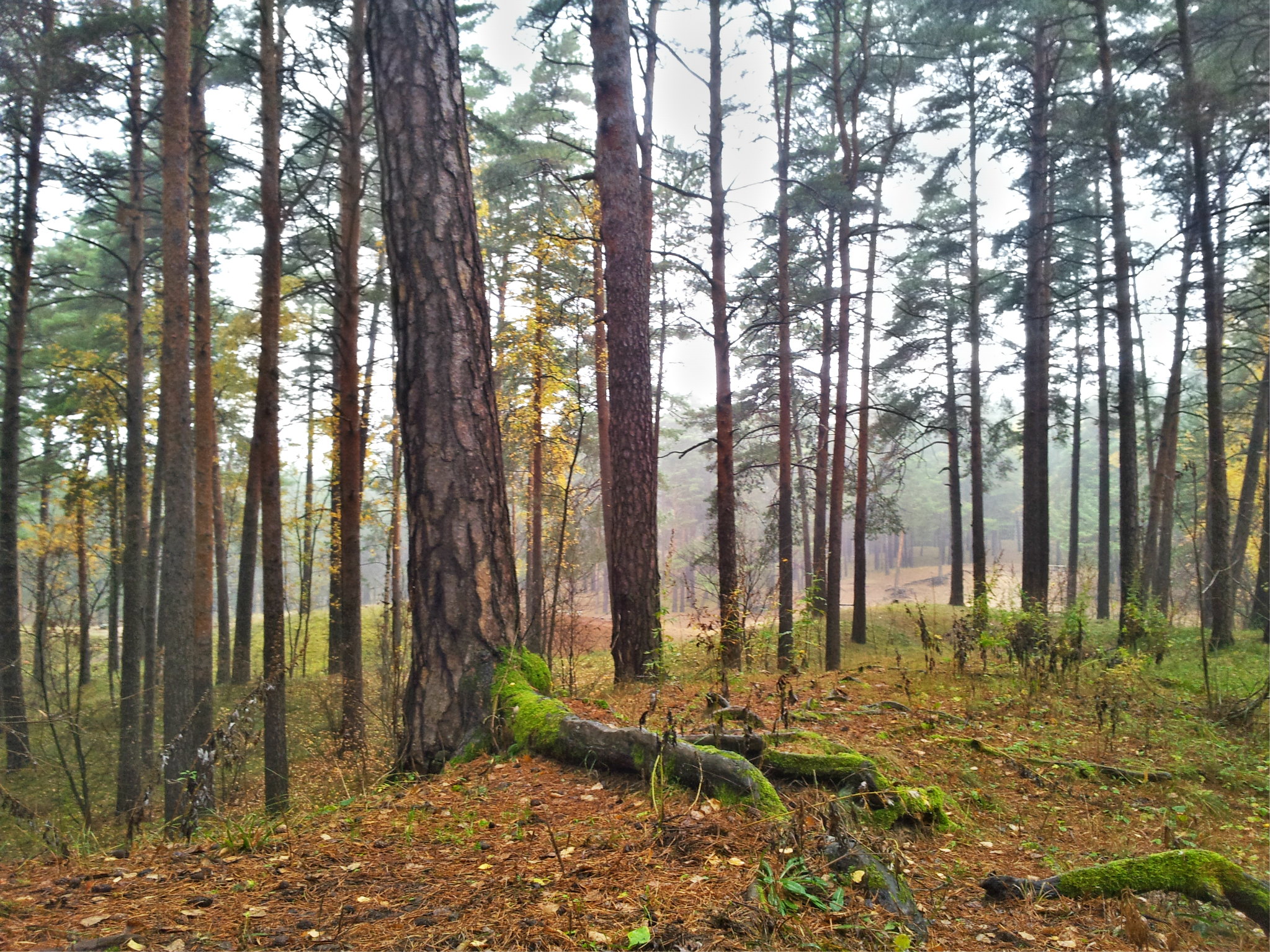
Undulating terrain with pine trees

The territory of Mežaparks was originally covered by the Baltic Ice Lake. The main terrain formed during the 5–7 thousands years of Littorina Sea. The 40–50 metres (130–160 ft) meter thick terrain is formed from sand and peat deposits of Baltic Ice Lake, Littorina Sea and their lagoons.

Most of the uneven dune-covered terrain is undulating with 6–8 metres (20–26 ft) dunes in the Northwest and 7–8 metres (23–26 ft) dunes in the West. The highest point is 18 metres (59 ft) above sea and Ķīšezers level among the dunes in the North side. The rest of the territory is relatively flat.

The water level at around 1.5–3 metres (5–10 ft). Due to the low water table and forested territory, the surface water drains and gets absorbed. There are no natural water bodies in the territory.

The park's green territory is covered by two overlapping protected conserved biotopes - old natural boreal forests (9010) and forested coastal dunes (2180). The forested coastal dunes cover all of the territory, notably north side and along Kisezers coastline. These dunes are prone to eutrophication and succession The boreal forest covers 185 ha. It also susceptible to eutrophication with vegetation characteristic of more "fruitful" forest biomes In paces, uncharacteristic species of trees grow in the forest like maple, tilia, aspen, as well as foreign species - Weymouth pine, European larch, northern red oak) that were both planted and self-planted. There are various protected plant species, such as Pulsatilla pratensis, Platanthera bifolia, or Lycopodium annotinum. Other vegetations includes various bushes and a few summer flowers, and few wintering species.

== History ==
Around 1225, the location become a part of Riga's forest territories. Beginning the 17th century, the area became commonly known as Ķēniņu mežs (lit. transl. old form for "King" and "forest") named after King Gustavus Adolphus of Sweden who set up an army camp in the forested area to flank Riga in 1621 during the Polish–Swedish War.

The first recreation and entertainment spots in the area frequented by citizens began forming as early as the 18th century. For example, various travelling animal circuses had frequented the location in the 19th century.

=== Before World War II ===
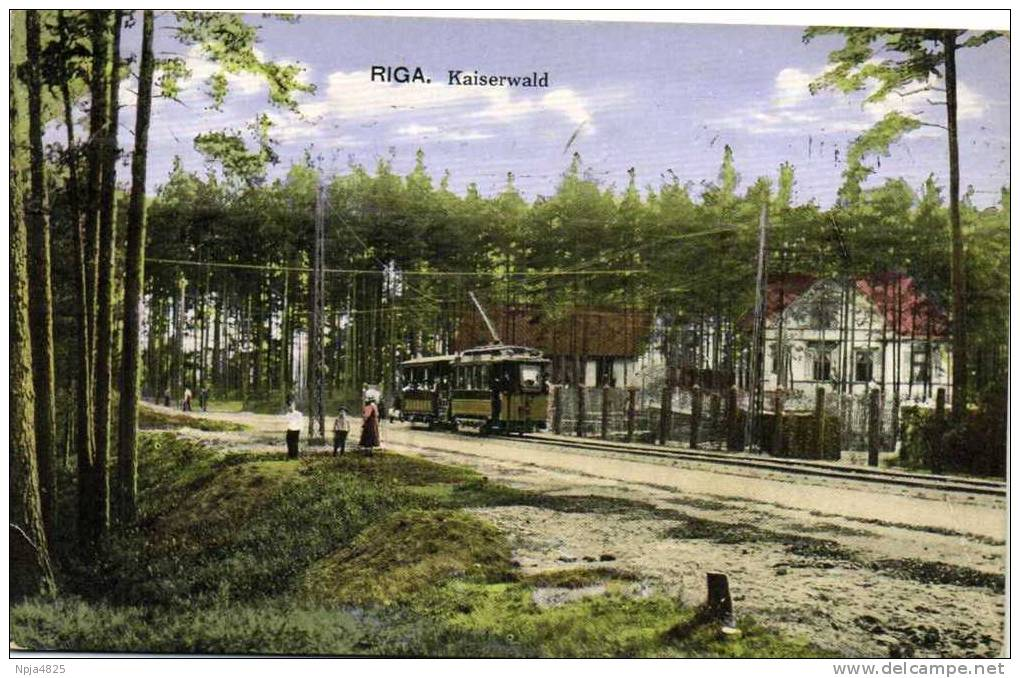
Ķeizarmežs at the start of 20th century

At the end of the 19th century, ideas were expressed by the principal Riga urban planner lv:Gustavs Ādolfs Agte and landscape architect Georg Kuphaldt who wanted to develop the forest and dune territory into a family park for recreation and entertainment. At the time, Europe was experiencing the garden city movement where city neighbourhoods were designed with preservation and integration of the natural environment in mind, such that private houses would be built in-between forested lines and close to water bodies. Kuphaldt's plan was to create a park taking Germany's and United Kingdom's park examples, while the street layout would preserve the existing trees and dunes. In 1900, Riga's government reviewed Kuphaldt's proposed project and decided to gradually develop Ķēniņu mežs to this vision. In 1901, to celebrate Riga's 700 anniversary, Riga City Council decided to formally establish the public park. On 30 April, the council officially designated the Ķēniņu mežs area to be used half as a recreational location, and half for villa and summer house construction. The neighbourhood became the first Russian Empire's architectural project to use the garden city movement borrowed from Western Europe. In 1904, the area was officially added to Riga city territory.

Riga City Council funded the Ķēniņu mežs development with 500,000 Rubles – to construct roads, a tram line, cycleways and bridleways. By 1902, the tram line was laid, beach swimming spots were established near the lake and various sport facilities were under construction. In 1903, a Baltic German sport club Kaizervalde (from German "Kaiserwald" – Kaiser and "forest") was formed, and the surrounding area became best known in Latvian as Ķeizarmežs. The club offered recreational activities in the park within the forest, green zones and swimming locations around lake. The focus was on land and water sports, as well as winter sports, including ski competitions, an ice rink and a sled track. The club also established Vidzeme yacht club (however, the admittance was only to Germans), and the regattas that took place garnered international notice. The development direction and activities were influenced by the prominent German physical culture of the time. The club also had its own cultural division that organized outdoor events, performances and concerts.

There had been an idea to construct a zoo in Riga since the 1860s. Due to the lack of government financing, Riga citizens were asked for donations, which were successfully gathered. A request for land to build a zoo was petitioned in 1907 and was allocated in 1911 next to Mežaparks. The next year, the opening ceremony was held for Riga Zoo ("Rīgas Zoodārzs"). Besides its primary function, various concerts were held at the zoo.

After Latvian War of Independence (1918), Ķeizarmežs continued functioning as a sports club and the area was continuously developed. Up until World War II, the region was primarily an elite neighbourhood, and only later became a recreational spot for all citizens. At the start of World War II (1939), it become "Rīgas vācu sporta biedrība" (Riga German Sports Association).

=== Soviet era ===
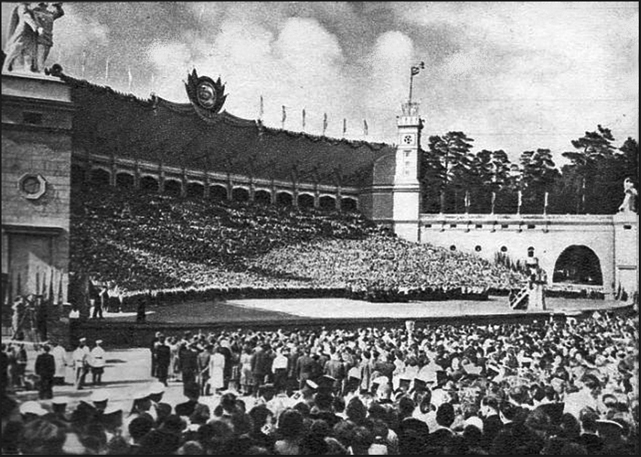
Mežaparks Great Bandstand in 1955

After Soviet occupation, in 1944, the park was renamed "Spartaka kompleksā sporta bāze" (Spartak Complex Sports Base). In 1949, the Soviet Government decided to establish a "cultural recreation" location for its workers. The 360 ha area North of the main neighbourhood had its layout already established by Kuphaldt's original plan and several straight alleys and curved roads had been laid. The then-forested area itself was already used by citizens for recreation during summer and winter. However, the government's plan called for an expansion of the area and construction of many structures similar to other cultural and recreational parks in USSR, such as in Moscow. The design of the park was entrusted to Russian architect Yevgeniy Vasilyev (Евгений Васильев). The Soviet government held a view that a Latvian architect would not design the park to fit the socialist and nationalist principles.

Mežaparks' quickly saw major improvements, primarily focused on recreational building construction. During this time period, the construction was influenced by Stalinist architecture style, known locally as "Stalin's Baroque". The new park design elements were influenced by Moscow's park and garden style, which also affected the natural territory structure and flora. In 1949, an open-air stage (that would later become the Green Theater) with 8000 visitor capacity was constructed. Park's project and construction finished in short order with participation from many city and other organizations, factories, etc. The park was announced as open on 20 July 1949, on Latvian SSR's 9th anniversary. The official opening ceremony for the park was held in 1950 in the Green Theater. The park was inaugurated as "Kultūras un atpūtas parks Mežaparks" (Cultural and Recreational Park Mežaparks) administered by USSR Ministry of Culture.

In the following years between 1950 and 1965, many recreational, cultural and sports-oriented objects were built. Notable locations include a cafe, a canteen, a bandstand, a reading hall, a children play "city", a parachute jumping tower, an ice ring, cycle and moto tracks, a boat dock, a panorama wheel, a ski base, a sports field, exposition pavilions, and various other attractions. In 1950, a large then-impressive cinema with 350 seats was built. A 3.5 km long children railroad with three stops was constructed. In 1955, the Great Bandstand was constructed with the primary goal to demonstrate USSR achievements, but later it also hosted Latvian identity-forming Song and Dance Festival. Overall, the park differed to the typical Soviet gathering locations by attracting mass cultural events and being more entertainment-focused. Various shows, exhibitions and conferences were held since.

=== Post-independence ===
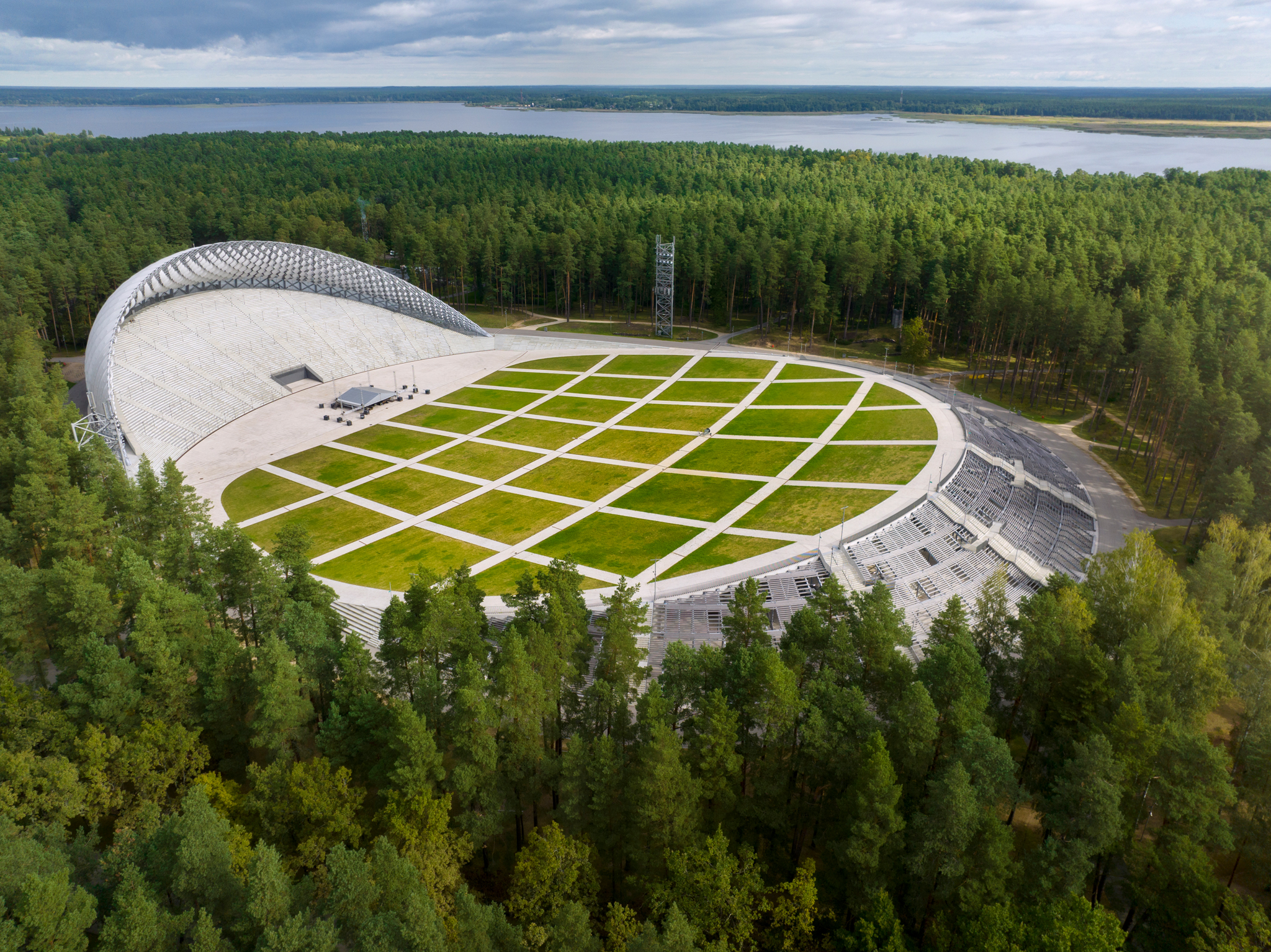
Mežaparks Great Bandstand after reconstruction in 2022, viewed from above.

Towards the end of the century and along the restoration of Latvia's independence, the park's administration saw many changes, as the governments attempted to find the best administration approach for the area. Between 1982 and 2009, the park was renamed numerous times and changed its administration between various Riga Council and ministry divisions and organizations. Eventually in 2009, the administration was passed onto the company SIA "Rīgas meži" who remain the maintainers of the area.

Most objects and buildings constructed in the 20th century no longer remain standing. Although nature-reclaimed concrete foundations and building ruins can still be found in the area, none of the structures constructed under Stalinist architecture remain. Structures, such as the original Green Theatre were dismantled by the 1980s. The cinema was dismantled in the 1980s and the remains were removed in 2002. The only exception is the Great Bandstand that is still standing and operational, although it has seen multiple changes due to ideological shifts and well as several reconstructions. The foot and bridle paths laid at the time have also been preserved and still remain in use. Various locations, including the Green Theater were rebuilt and restored at the start of the century.
