= Riga Zoo =

Zoo in Riga, Latvia

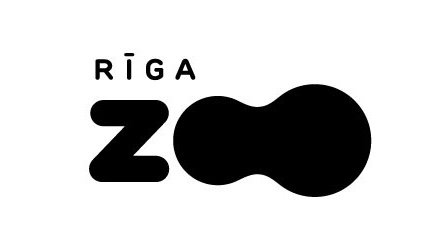
- Riga Zoo Logo

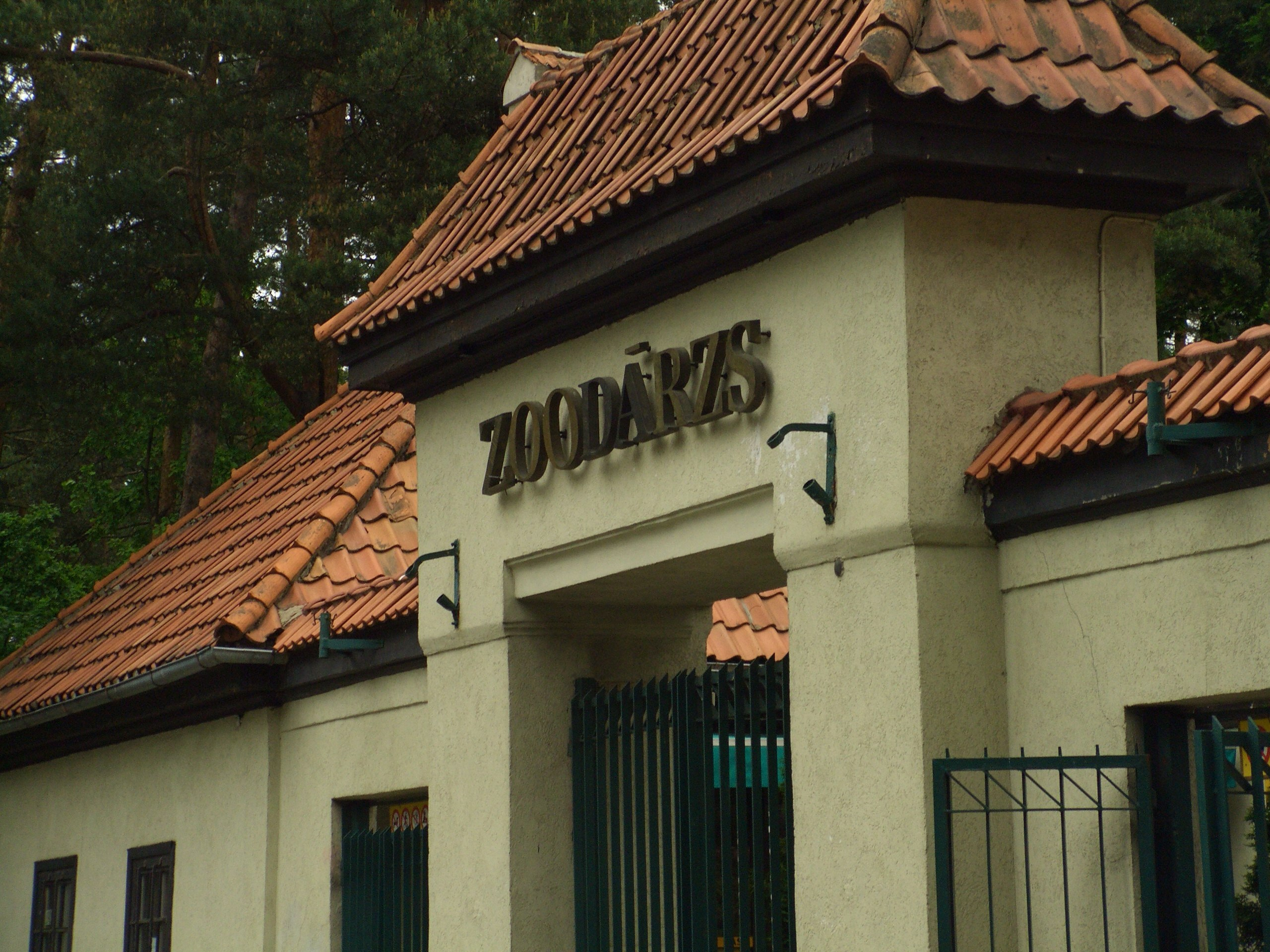
- Entrance
- Interactive map of Riga Zoo
- 57.006111°N 24.157500°E
- Date opened: 14 October 1912
- Location: Riga, Latvia
- Land area: 16.4 ha (41 acres)
- No. of animals: 3270
- No. of species: 486
- Memberships: EAZA
- Website: rigazoo.lv

Riga Zoo is a city-owned zoo in Riga, Latvia. It is located in Mežaparks neighbourhood next to the Mežaparks park, on the western bank of Ķīšezers lake. Riga Zoo houses around 4000 animals of nearly 500 species and is visited by 250–300,000 visitors annually. The zoo has a branch "Cīruļi" in Liepāja district, Kalvene parish, established in 1996, it has an area of 135 hectares (330 acres).

== History ==
In 1908 a society was established to coordinate the formation of the zoo, and in April 1911, 16.4 ha (41 acres) of land was allocated for this purpose. The zoo was opened to the public on 14 October 1912; it housed 267 animals of 88 species at the time. Many animals were donated to the zoo; in 1914, the zoo received 538 animals.

During World War I the zoo experienced hardships and closed in August 1917 after German army occupied Riga city; after the war a camp for children of low income families was established at the site. On 29 December 1932 a society was established, which renewed the zoo and it was reopened on 24 September 1933 housing 124 animals of 48 species; by 1938 number of species had increased to 106.

During World War II the development of the zoo stalled; however, animals and buildings of zoo were preserved and on 9 November 1944 the zoo was opened to the public again. After the war, the zoo experienced rapid growth and was considered one of the best zoos in Soviet Union. In 1950, an aquarium was created and in 1955 a tour guide service was created. However, construction of new housing for the animals failed to match the growth of the zoo, new housing, such as a flamingo house and a bear house, were built in 1980–1985. In 1987, the zoo housed 2150 animals of 401 species. In 1988 the zoo began work on the reintroduction of the European tree frog; as a result, the species now can be found in the wild in many parts of Courland.

After Latvia regained its independence in 1991, the zoo experienced hard times as the number of visitors, which had ranged from 250 to 300,000 visitors annually, was reduced to some 110,000. To attract visitors, the zoo began several development projects and worked on public relations and now the number of visitors is once again about 250–300,000 annually. In 1992, the zoo joined the European Association of Zoos and Aquaria. In 1996 zoo established an affiliate "Cīruļi". Several new animal houses have been built in 1990s and 2000s. In 2002, an additional 0.035 km^{2} of land was incorporated into the zoo.

== Current development ==
The latest big addition to the zoo has been African Savannah exhibit in 2019 with animals such as geladas, impalas, zebras and elands. The Giraffe house built in 2007 is also a part of the Savannah.

In 2022 zoo has presented a plan to transform into four-season biopark called “Masterplan 2035”. In seven stages of which Himalaya is the first the zoo will be rebuilt by making the visitor experience more immersive and authentic. The animal exhibitions planned in Himalaya include snow leopard, manul, takin, bearded vultures and other species.

== Research projects and conservation efforts ==
Riga Zoo enacts several scientific research and wild life conservation projects.

=== Monitoring of owl autumn migration ===
Owls are monitored since 1985 in Pape Nature Reserve. The aim of the project is to collect information of owl migration in northern Europe and compare annual differences. Owls are trapped to determine their species, the number of young birds and other data. Birds are ringed and set free.

=== Reintroduction of European tree frog in Latvia ===
This project was started in 1988 in southwestern Courland, where a wildlife reserve was established for the purpose. The project aims to reintroduce the European tree frog, which had become extinct in Latvia decades before project begun. In 1988-1992 more than 4000 young frogs were released in wild; by 2001 about five generations of frogs had bred in the wild and 110 distinct frog colonies existed.

=== Vulture breeding project ===
A breeding complex was established in the zoo's affiliate "Cīruļi" in 2000. White-tailed eagles, lesser spotted eagles, peregrine falcons, barn owls and Eurasian eagle-owls are bred to reintroduce these species in Latvia and extend existing populations.

=== Research of lesser spotted eagle behaviour traits ===
As most studies of lesser spotted eagle in Latvia have been made to research their habitat range and population, this project aims to learn more about various habits of lesser spotted eagles by visually monitoring and recording their actions.

=== Entomology research ===
Riga Zoo researchers have participated in various entomology expeditions since 1989. In 1989-1993 expeditions were made to various places in the former Soviet Union (Ukraine, Central Asia, Azerbaijan, Southern Siberia, Primorsk, Sakhalin and Kunashir Island). Since 1994, Riga Zoo has participated in six expeditions to Vietnam, where ten new species have been found during these expeditions.

== Gallery ==
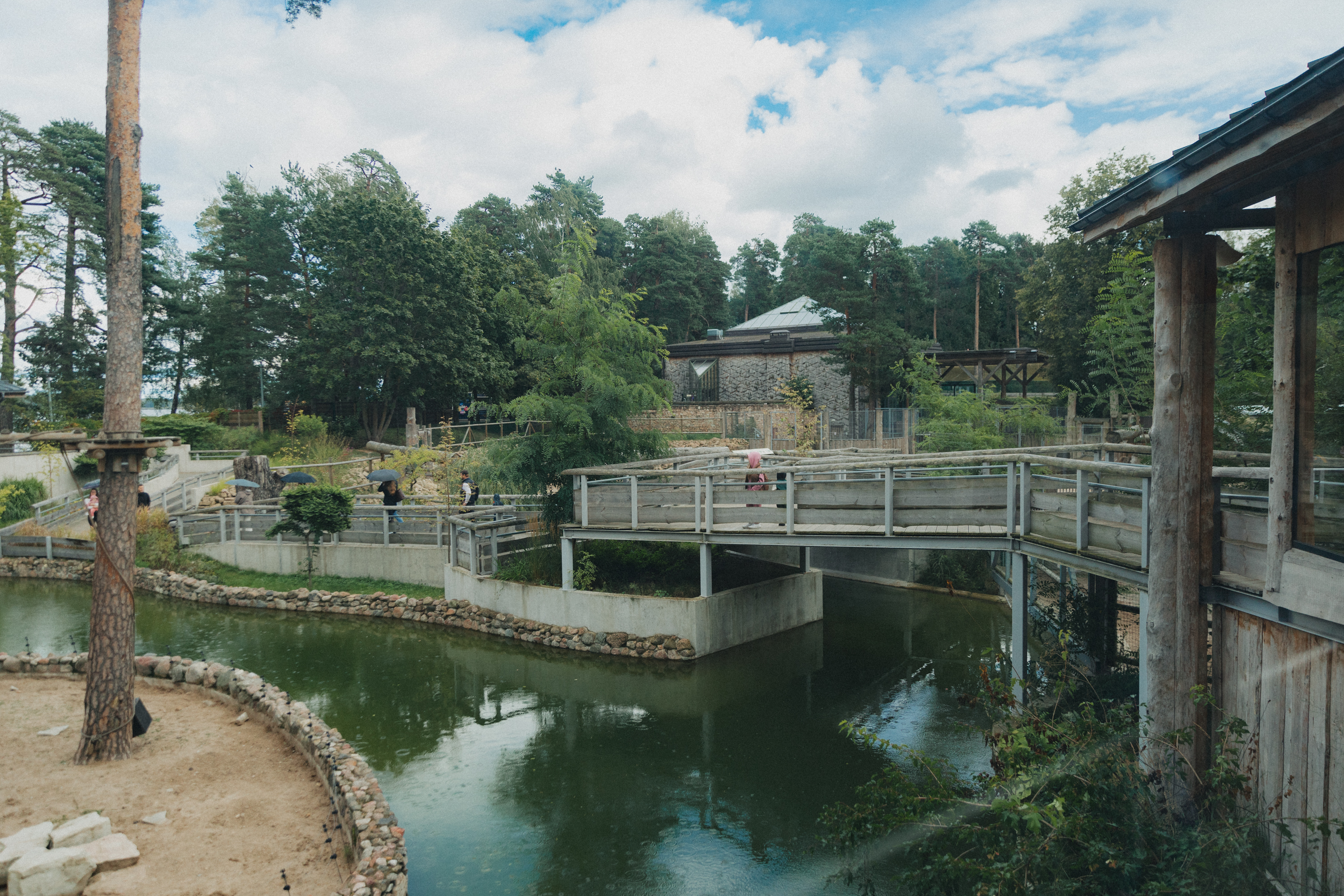

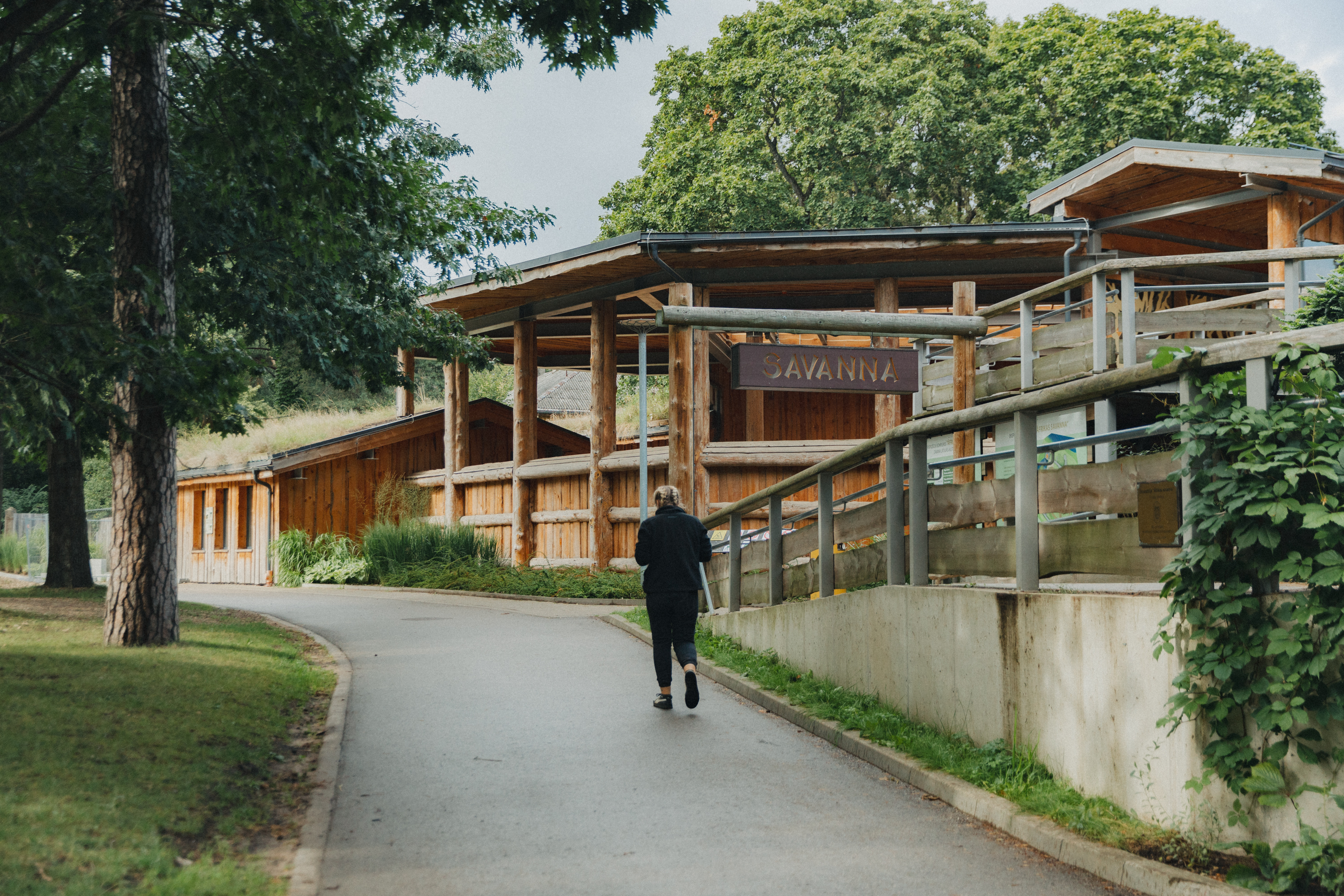

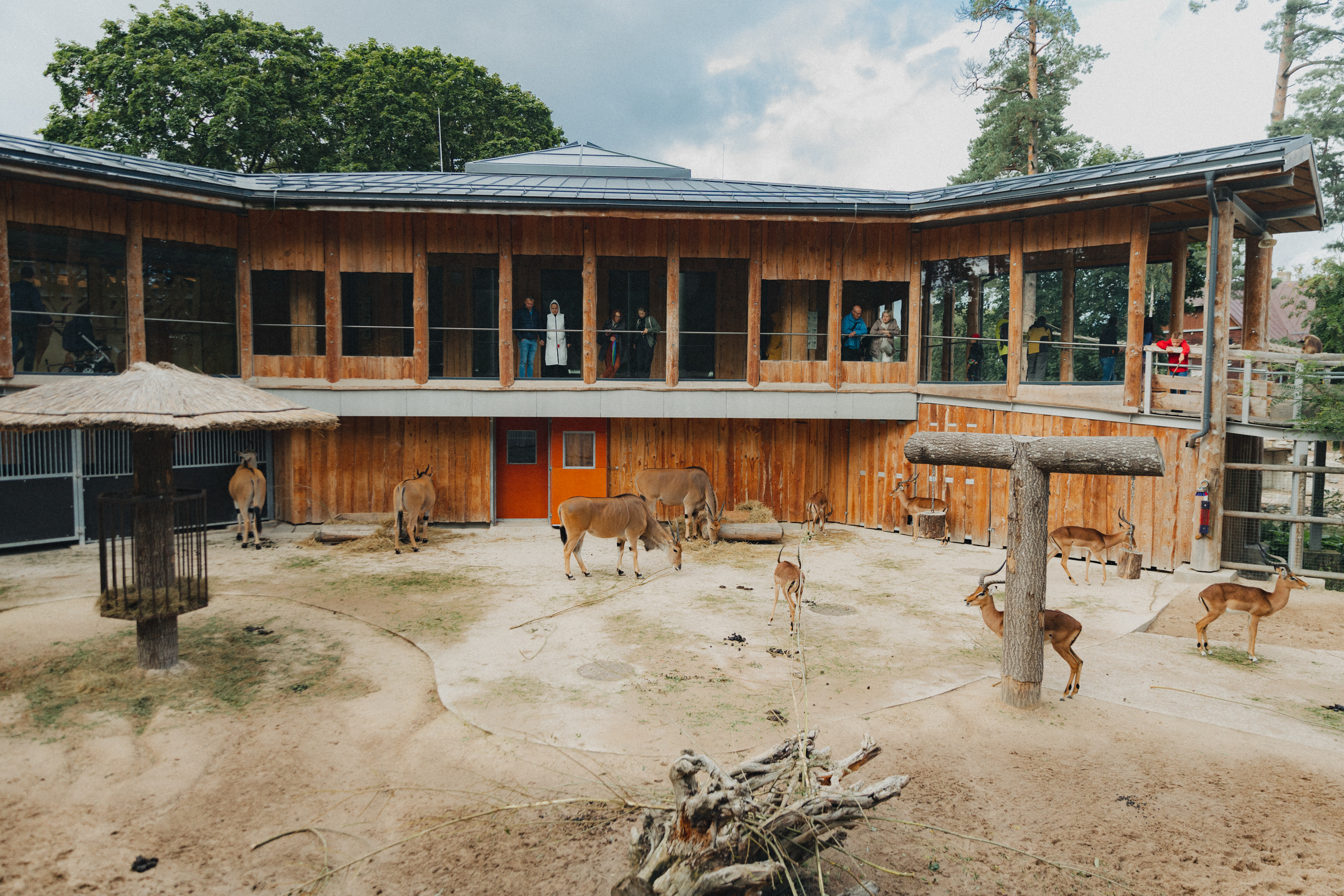

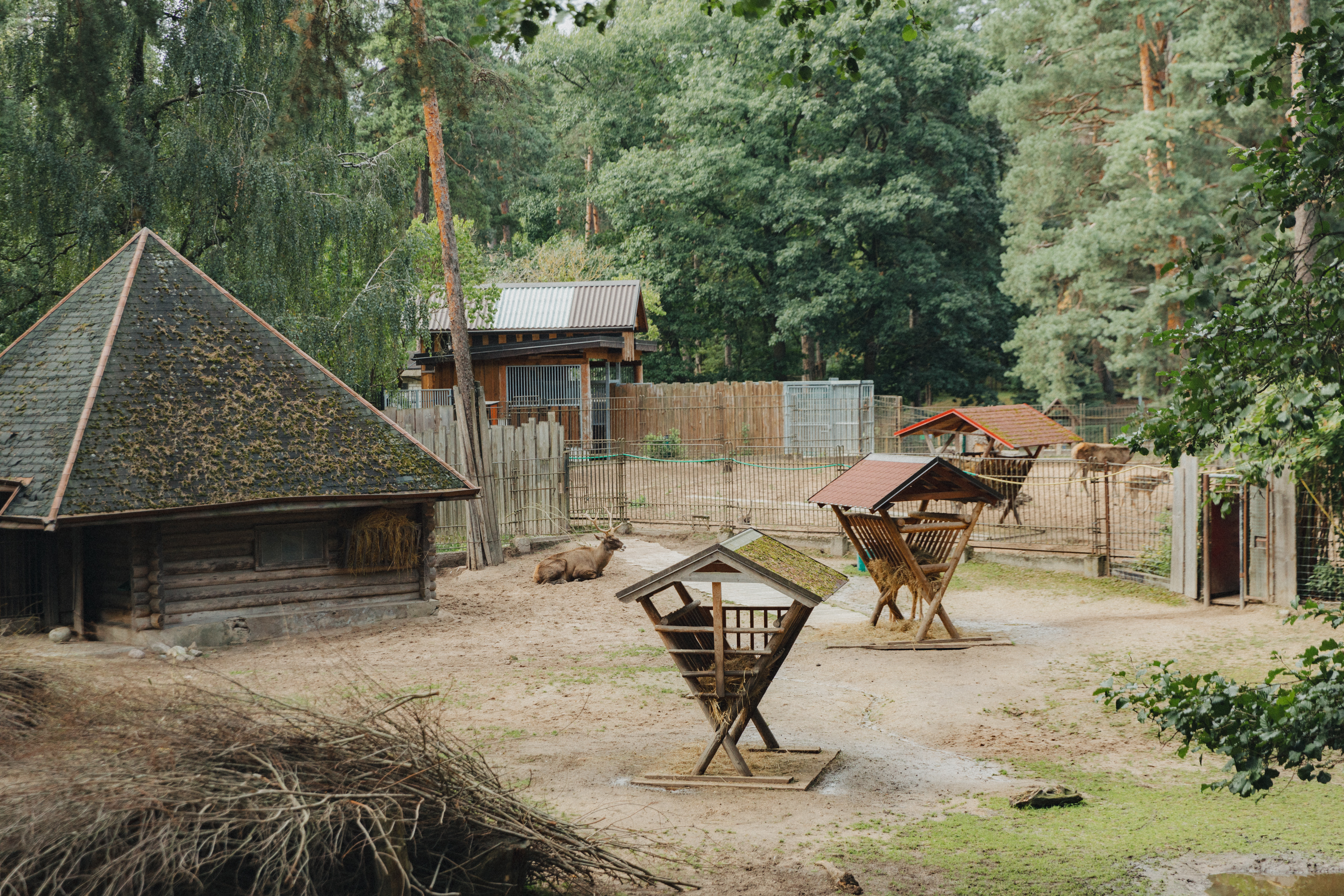

== See also ==
- Čabulītis
- Latgale Zoo
