= Saturn (alligator) =

American alligator residing in the Moscow Zoo (1936–2020)

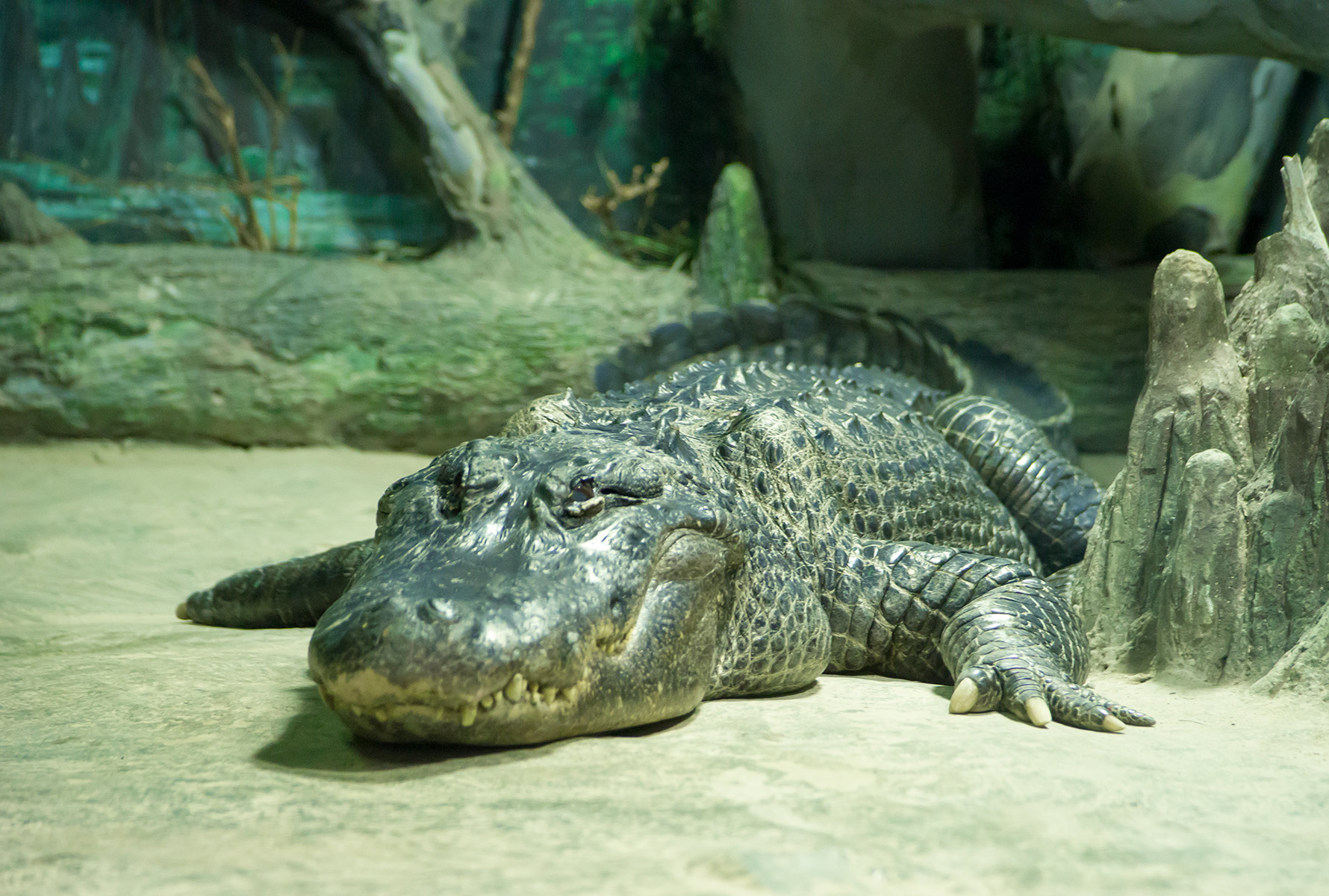
- An American alligator at the Moscow Zoo, possibly Saturn
- Other name: Hitler
- Species: Alligator mississippiensis (American alligator)
- Sex: Male
- Hatched: 1936 Mississippi U.S.
- Died: May 22, 2020 (aged 83–84); Moscow, Russia
- Known for: One of the longest-lived alligators in captivity Rumored to have been Adolf Hitler's pet
- Residence: Moscow Zoo prev. Berlin Zoological Garden
- Named after: Saturn prev. Adolf Hitler

Saturn (Russian: Сату́рн, IPA: [sɐˈturn]; 1936 – 22 May 2020) was an American alligator residing in the Moscow Zoo. He was the subject of an urban myth that he was previously Adolf Hitler's "pet alligator".

After hatching in Mississippi, Saturn was brought to Nazi Germany, residing at the Berlin Zoological Garden. It was here that his association with Adolf Hitler originated, as Hitler reportedly enjoyed visiting the zoo and especially liked the alligator. However, while Hitler may have viewed Saturn at the zoo, he was never Hitler's personal pet. During World War II, the Berlin Zoo was destroyed, but Saturn was discovered by British soldiers three years later. The British then gave the alligator to the Soviets in 1946. He lived at the Moscow Zoo until 22 May 2020, when he died of old age.

== Physical description ==
Saturn was described as having been 2 to 3.5 metres (6.6 to 11.5 ft) long and weighing 200 kilograms (440 lb). Like most alligators, he had green scales, a broad mouth, and yellow eyes.

== Berlin Zoological Garden ==
Saturn was hatched in the wild in the U.S. state of Mississippi in 1936. He was captured that year and was shipped to Berlin, where he was brought to the Berlin Zoological Garden. It was from this period that the popular rumor emerged that Saturn was Adolf Hitler's "pet". This may have originated with the author Boris Akunin, a Russian writer who hypothesized in an article that this may have been the case. In actuality, he was not Hitler's personal pet, as he was on public display at the zoo. However, some sources report his display at the zoo as being part of a personal menagerie of Hitler's, while Dmitry Vasilyev, a veterinarian at the Moscow Zoo, contends that while Saturn was not Hitler's pet, the two certainly came into contact, as Hitler was known to have visited the Berlin Zoo on occasion.

During World War II, much of the Berlin Zoo was destroyed. Of the zoo's 16,000 animals, only 96 survived. When the aquarium building was destroyed by a bomb on 23 November 1943, 20 to 30 alligators and crocodiles were killed. Press reports documented that the streets near the aquarium were littered with alligator and crocodile corpses, but that some, including Saturn, had survived and were wandering through the city in search of food.

== Moscow Zoo ==
At the close of the war, the Berlin Zoo area came under the jurisdiction of the British Zone of Occupation. In 1946, British soldiers discovered Saturn, and brought him to Leipzig, then part of the Soviet Zone of Occupation, where they gave Saturn to the Soviets. Because the Moscow tourism office burnt down in the 1950s, the exact details of how Saturn came to Russia are unknown, but the Red Army transported Saturn, along with an Indian python, to Moscow in July 1946, bringing him to live in the Moscow Zoo. When the alligator arrived there, he instantly became a popular attraction, as there were only two crocodiles at the zoo and no other alligators. His German origins earned him the nickname 'Hitler', but he was later given the name 'Saturn'. When Russian tanks were moving down the Garden Ring during the 1993 constitutional crisis, Saturn cried out because of the vibrations, which a zookeeper thought reminded him of the Battle of Berlin.

In the 1950s, the United States gave the Soviet Union a younger, female alligator as a gift. She was named Shipka, and she and Saturn began mating, but they did not produce any offspring as all of Shipka’s eggs were infertile. Shipka, who was thirteen years younger than Saturn, later died, and Saturn was so distressed by her death that he refused food for a time. By 2005, Saturn had a new mate, who was then thirty years old.

During his time at the Moscow Zoo, Saturn experienced several narrow escapes from death. In the 1980s, a slab of concrete fell from the aquarium's ceiling into the alligator enclosure, but he was in a protective niche at the time. In 1990, a new aquarium building was built, but Saturn resisted the move, refusing to eat for four months and coming close to death. On another occasion, a drunk zoo visitor threw a boulder on his head to wake him up, after which zoo veterinarians fought to keep him alive for months. Later, a group of tourists threw glass bottles at Saturn, injuring him. After these incidents, the enclosure was made more secure with the addition of a thick glass wall. In the 2010s, Saturn once again stopped eating, this time for nearly a year. Zoo staff took blood samples for analysis, and injected him with vitamins to try to keep him alive. He eventually resumed eating.

In his later years, Saturn spent much of his time sleeping. He ate a diet of fish, rabbits, and rats twice a week. Vladimir Kudryavtsev, the head of the Moscow Zoo's reptile department, said that not many visitors knew of Saturn's eventful history. Zoo staff only related Saturn's German origins to groups of visiting schoolchildren. When school groups came, the zookeepers allowed children to stick the end of a broomstick into the enclosure, which was safe because Saturn was generally peaceful. His only violent incident occurred in 1970, when he tried to bite an inexperienced warden who tried to feed him by hand.

In 2015, the Moscow Zoo renovated the Terrarium, where the alligator enclosure is located. A new interior and reconstructed enclosure were completed, and Saturn returned to public display. That year, Saturn was also sponsored by French clothing company Lacoste, whose logo is a crocodile.

The Moscow Zoo announced that Saturn had died at the age of 83 or 84 on 22 May 2020. Mississippi alligators usually live 30–50 years in the wild. Saturn may have been the world's oldest alligator, although the title may belong to Muja, a male alligator residing at the Belgrade Zoo who is still alive as of May 2025 and is in his 80s. At the time of his death, Saturn was planned to be taxidermied, and on 9 December 2020 his remains were placed on display at the State Darwin Museum, a biology museum in Moscow.
