= Mežaparks =

Neighbourhood of Riga, Latvia

Coordinates: 57°00′N 24°10′E

- Neighbourhood of Riga
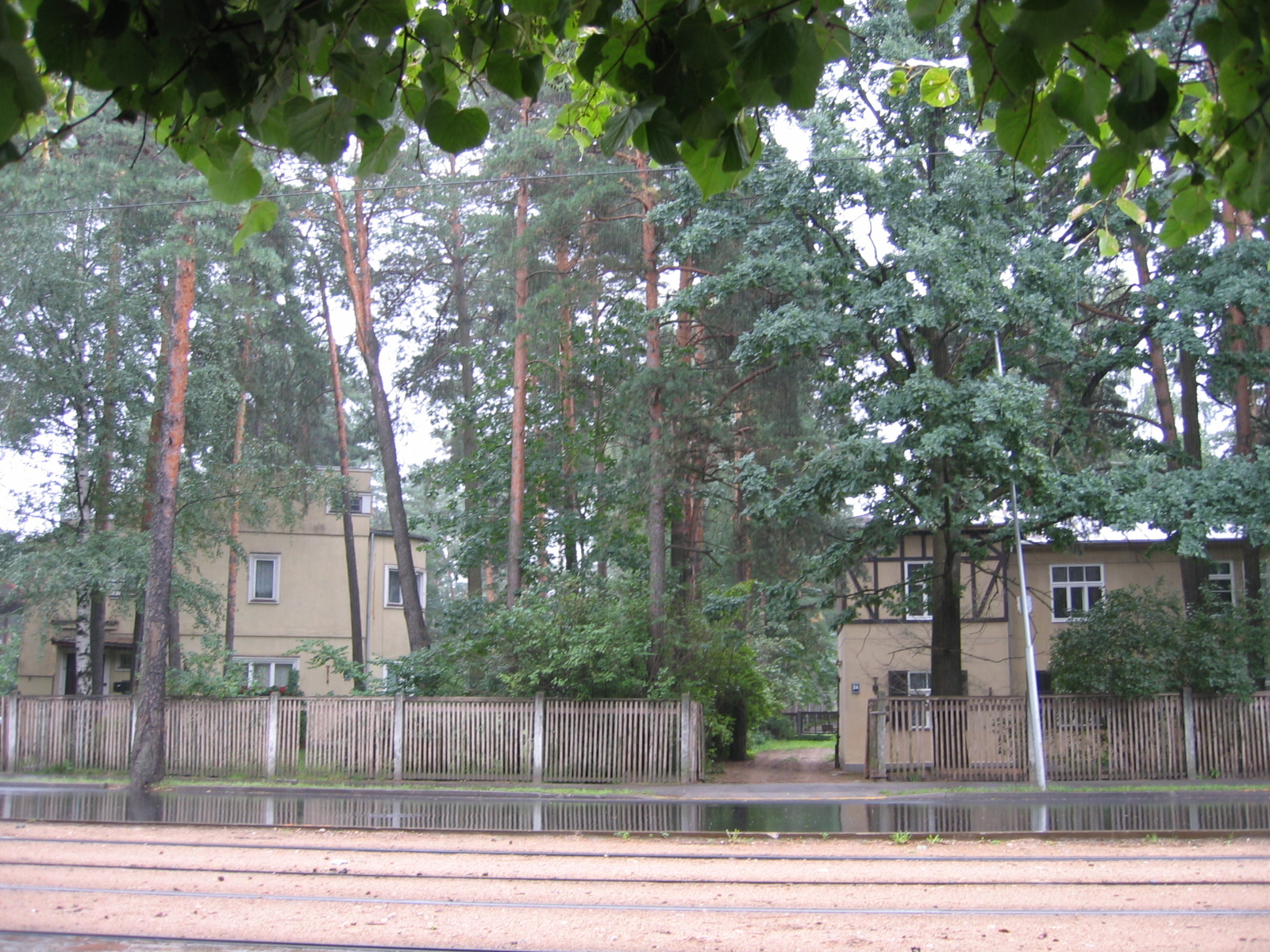
- Typical residences in Mežaparks

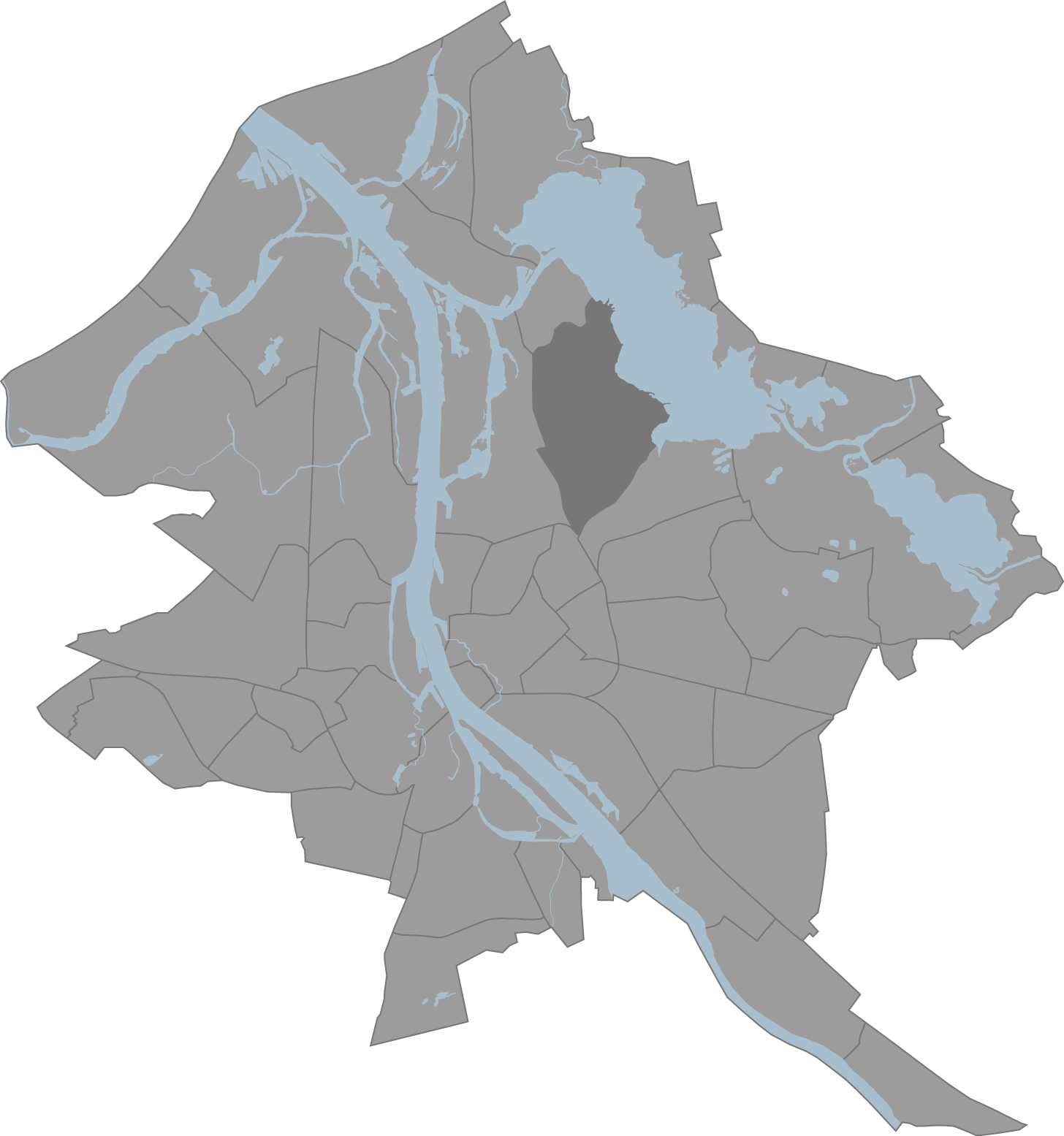
- Location of Mežaparks in Riga
- Country: Latvia
- City: Riga
- District: Northern District

Area
  - Total: 11.821 km^{2} (4.564 sq mi)

Population (2017)
  - Total: 4,457
  - Density: 377.0/km^{2} (976.5/sq mi)
- Website: apkaimes.lv

Mežaparks (German: Kaiserwald) is a neighbourhood of Northern District in Riga, the capital of Latvia. It consists of a residential area to the South and a large urban park to the North of the same name – Mežaparks. The neighbourhood is located on the western shore of Lake Ķīšezers. The name is literally translated as "forest park". The neighbourhood and park were built in the early 20th century and the area was originally called Kaiserwald. It was one of the world's first garden cities. It had large number of Art Nouveau and Eclectic villas for upper class inhabitants of Riga. During the Second World War, the Kaiserwald concentration camp was located in this park, and many Jews, Gypsies, Communists, and other opponents of Nazi rule were murdered in these woods.

Today it is still one of the wealthier areas of Riga, the Mežaparks Great Bandstand hosts the Latvian Song and Dance Festival in early July every five years.

Mežaparks is also host to the Riga Zoo and its lakeside locale allows for various water sporting activities. There is also an amusement park in Mežaparks, which makes the neighborhood a popular summer destination for Riga residents.

== Park ==
There is a large urban park on the North side of the neighbourhood. The park is where the open-air Mežaparks Great Bandstand and Riga Zoo are located, as well as access to Ķīšezers lake. The 424 ha (1,048 acres) territory is covered with coastal dunes, much of it with boreal forests, both protected conserved biotopes. The territory began to be used for recreation in 18th century and was added to Riga's territory in 19th century. In 1901, the Mežaparks neighbourhood became Russian Empire's first architectural project to use the garden city movement. The area was expanded and developed during the first half of 20th century, primarily serving as an elite sports complex. After World War II in 1949, the Soviet Government carried out a major expansion of the park and inaugurated it as a public park with many recreational areas and buildings. Up until the end of 20th century, the park continued to serve as a public park. Although little of the Soviet architecture survives, the park has seen a resurgence after restoration of Latvia's independence and is currently a popular recreational location. The park along the neighbourhood is a national heritage site and architectural cultural monument.

== Gallery ==
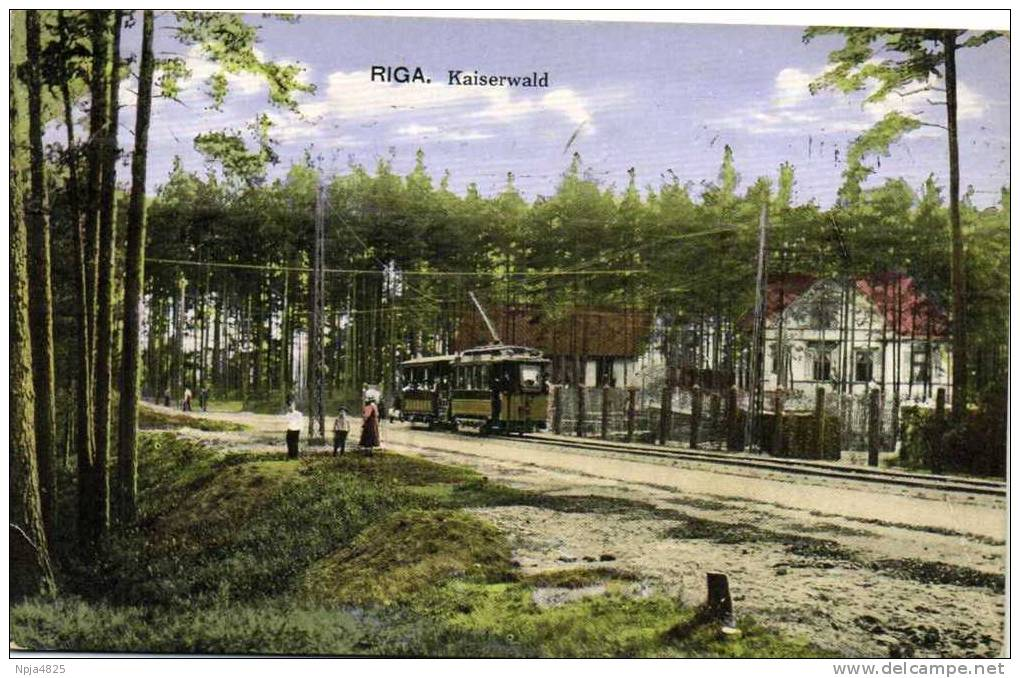
Mežaparks in the beginning of 20th century

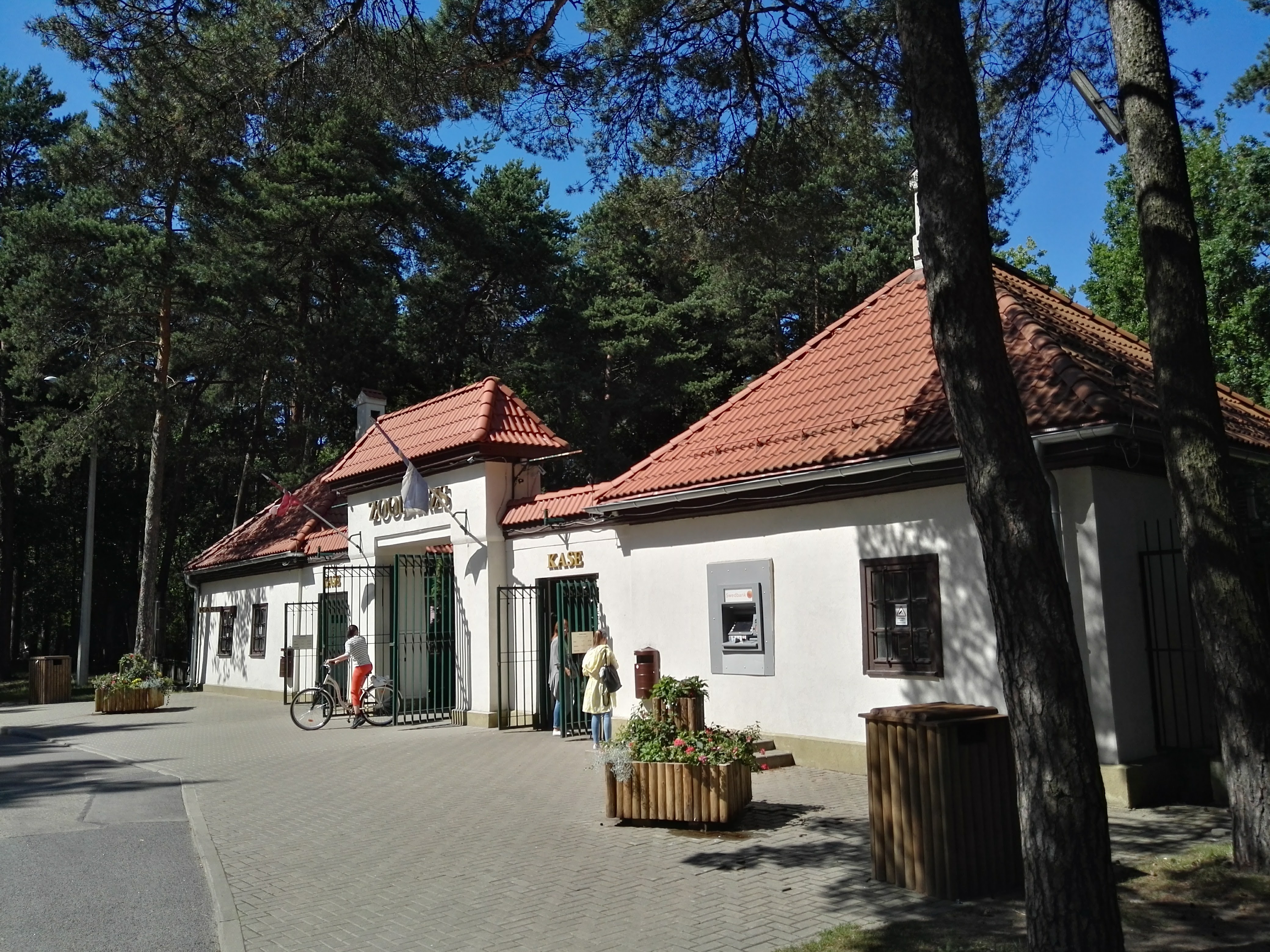
Entrance of Riga Zoo

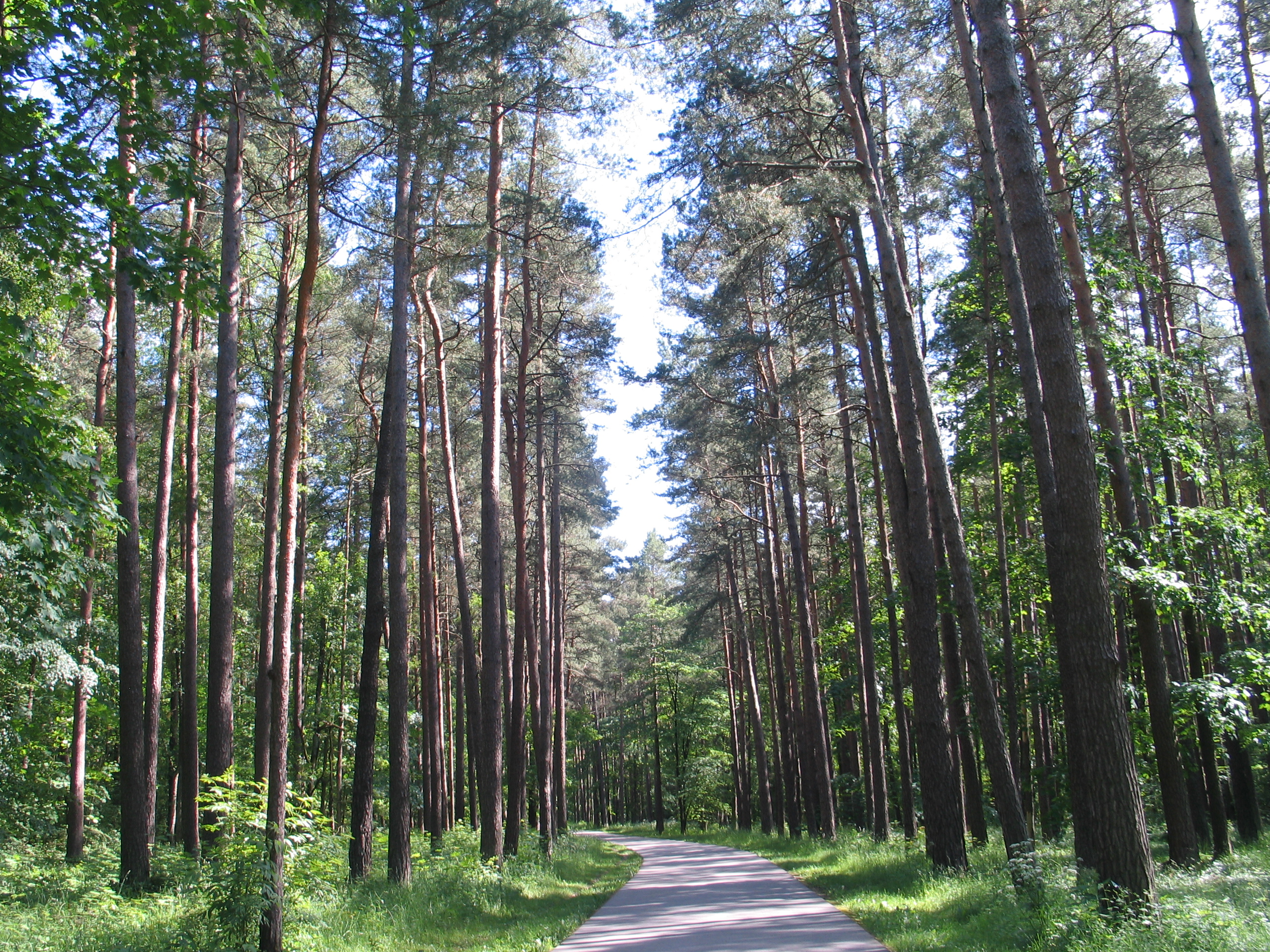
Path in Mežaparks forest park.

Mežaparks Great Bandstand

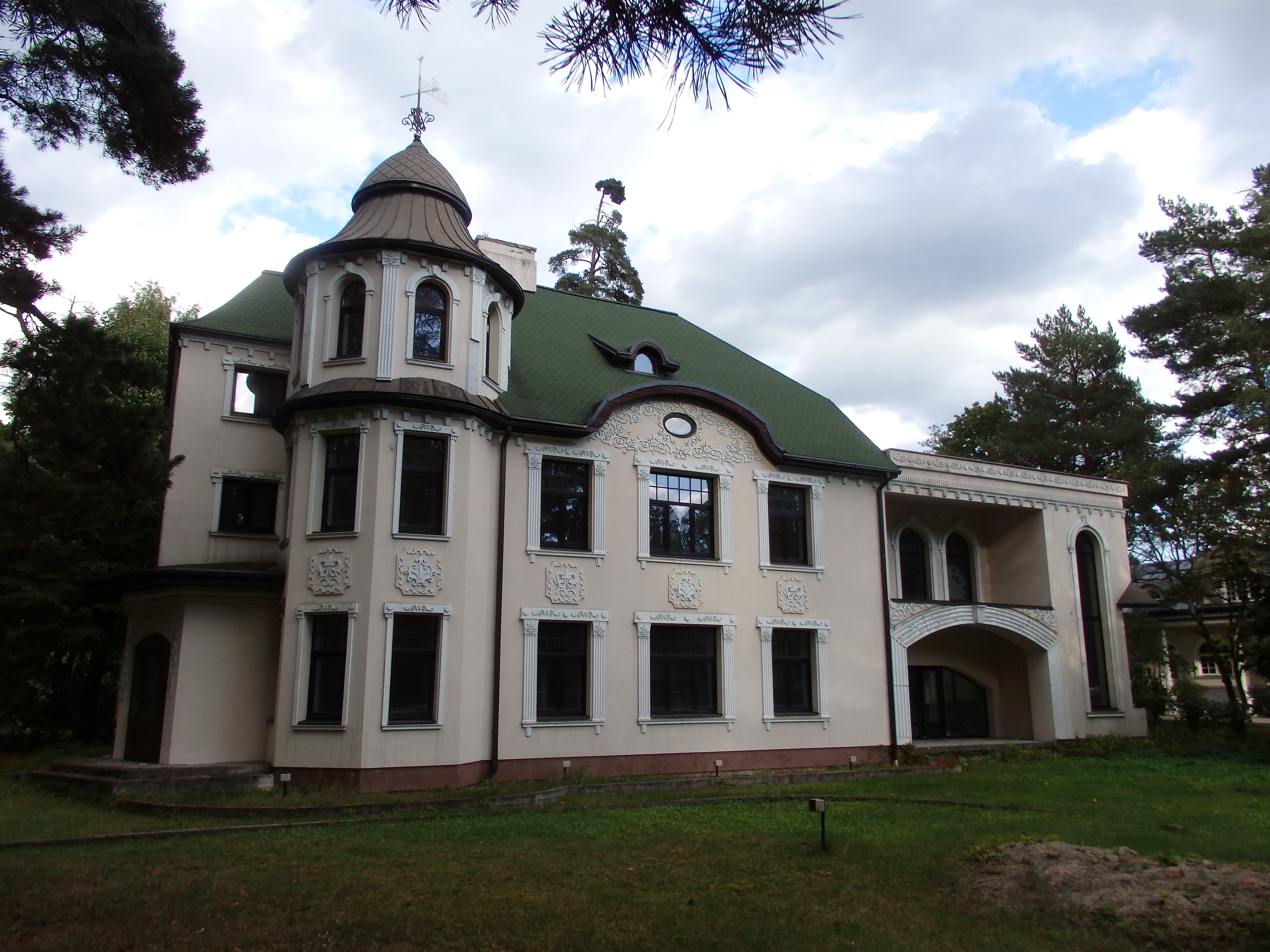
Mansion on Meža prospekts 32.

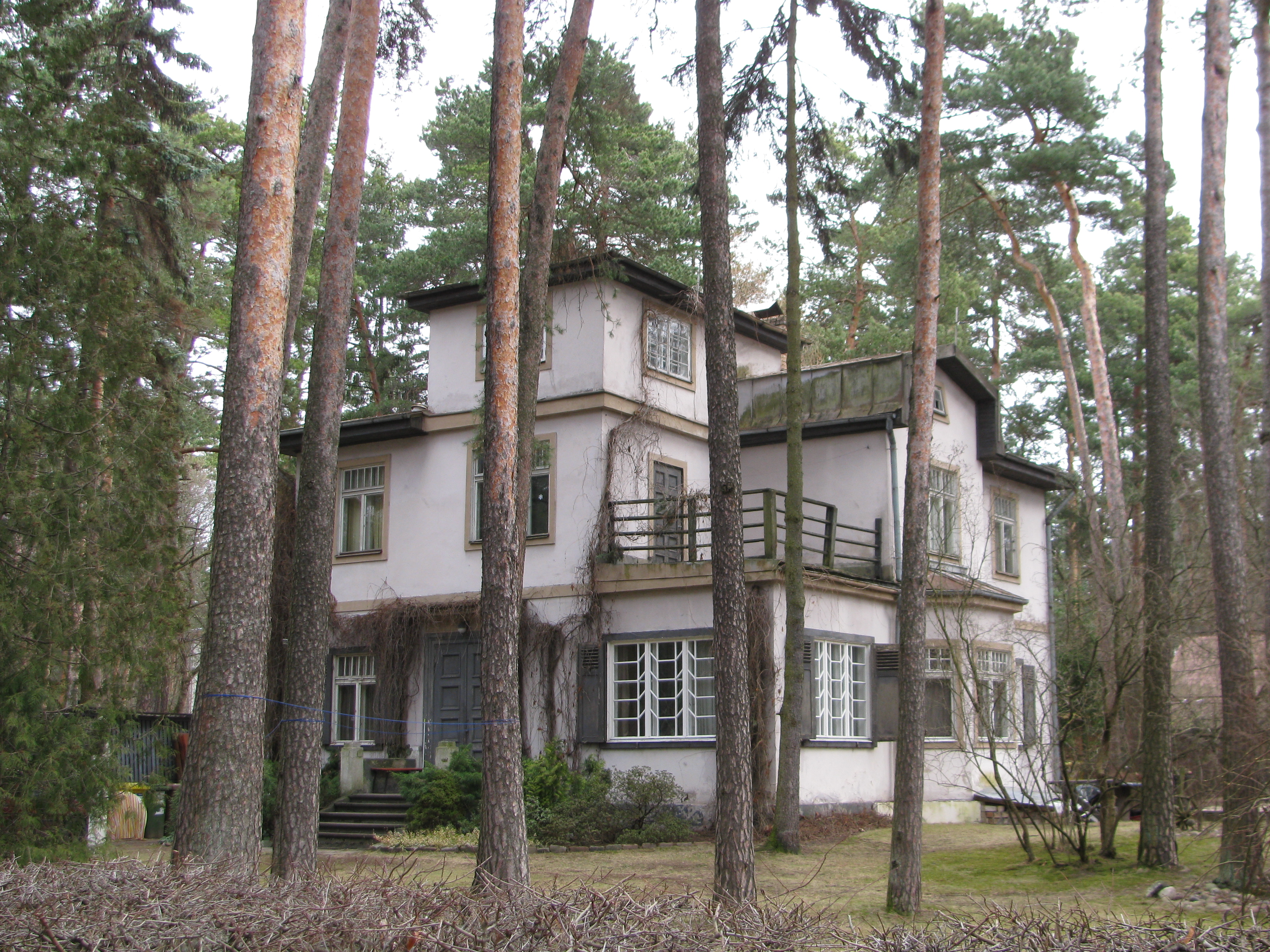
Mansion on Siguldas prospekts 10

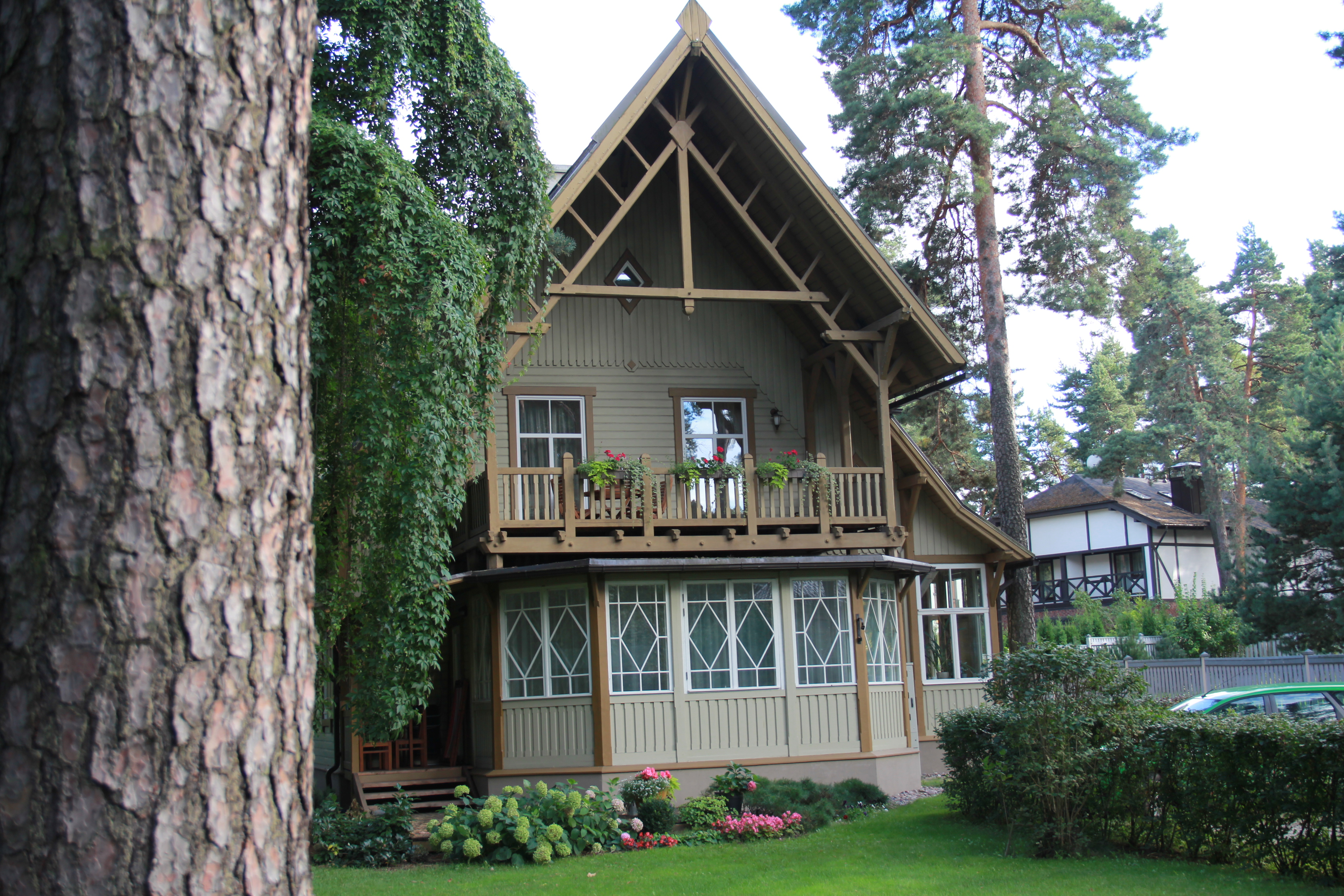
Wooden mansion on Hamburgas street 5.

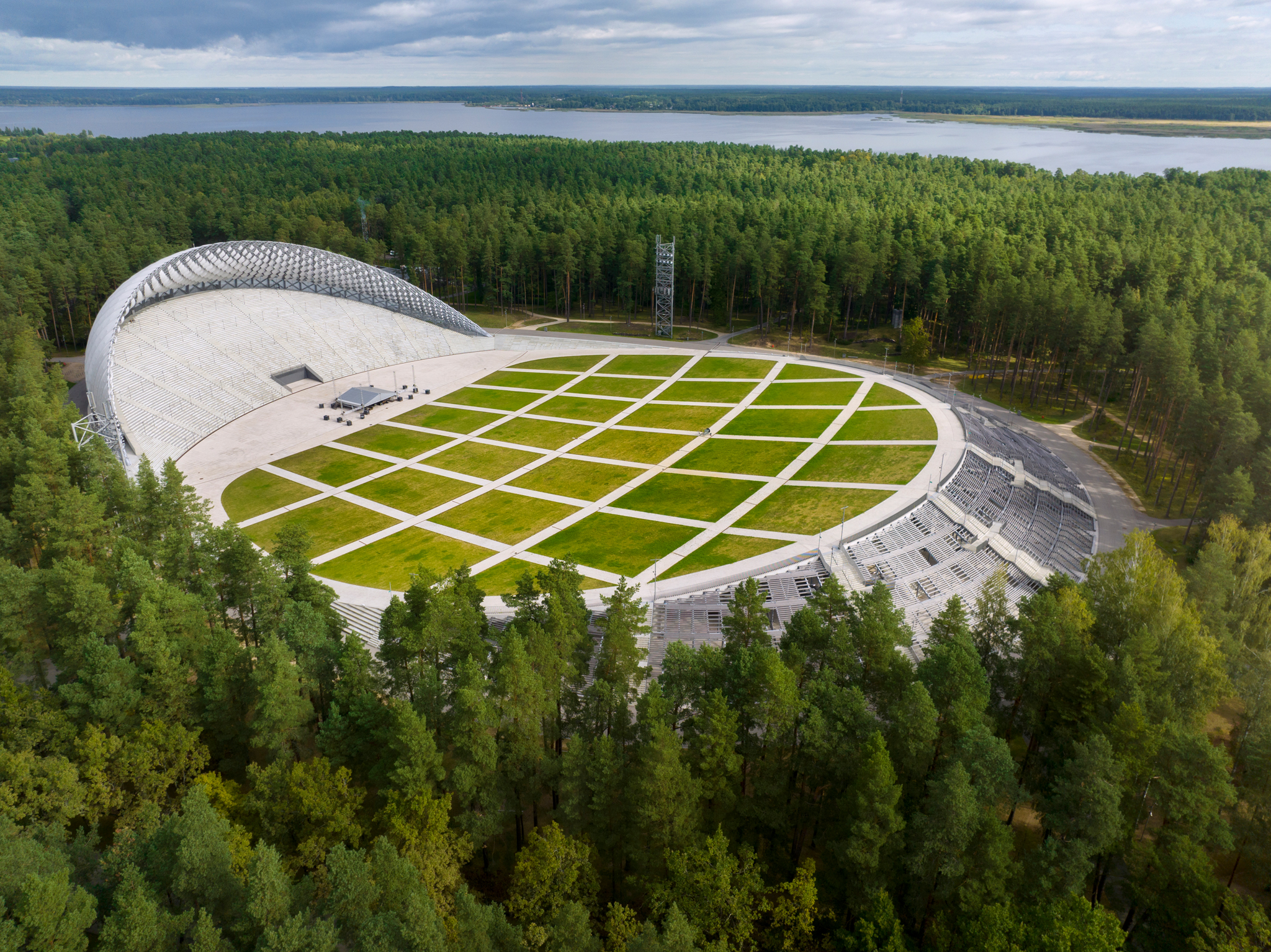
Aerial view of the Mežaparks Great Bandstand
