= Palić Zoo =

- Palić Zoo logo
- Interactive map of Palić Zoo
- 46.0989625°N 19.7498345°E
- Date opened: 1949
- Location: Palić, Serbia
- Land area: 10 hectares (25 acres)
- No. of species: 65
- Annual visitors: 160,000
- Website: www.zoopalic.co.rs

Palić Zoo is a 10-hectare (25-acre) zoo and gardens founded in 1949 and located in Palić, North Serbia, a part of the City of Subotica, 5 kilometres (3.1 mi) from the E75 Budapest – Belgrade highway.

== History ==
It was believed that the lake water and mud at Palić Lake had healing powers, and from the mid-1880s to the beginning of World War I, Palić was a popular spa destination. After World War II, the zoo was conceived as part of an effort to bring tourism back to the area. The zoo was opened in 1949.

== Animals ==
The zoo is home to about 150 species of animals, including monkeys, deer, antelope, zebras, giraffes, lions, elephants, camels, tigers, wolves, polar bears, emu, ostriches, and other birds, as well as snakes, reptiles, and tarantulas. The zoo is also home to some domesticated animals including donkeys, goats, and horses.

== Landscaping ==
The Zoo includes ponds and fountains, as well as more than 270 species of trees and shrubs, including Lebanon cedars, sequoias, and larch, as well as many domestic species. The northern part of the zoo is covered with evergreen trees and the southern part is predominantly deciduous. The zoo includes a children's playground and a petting zoo.

== Gallery ==
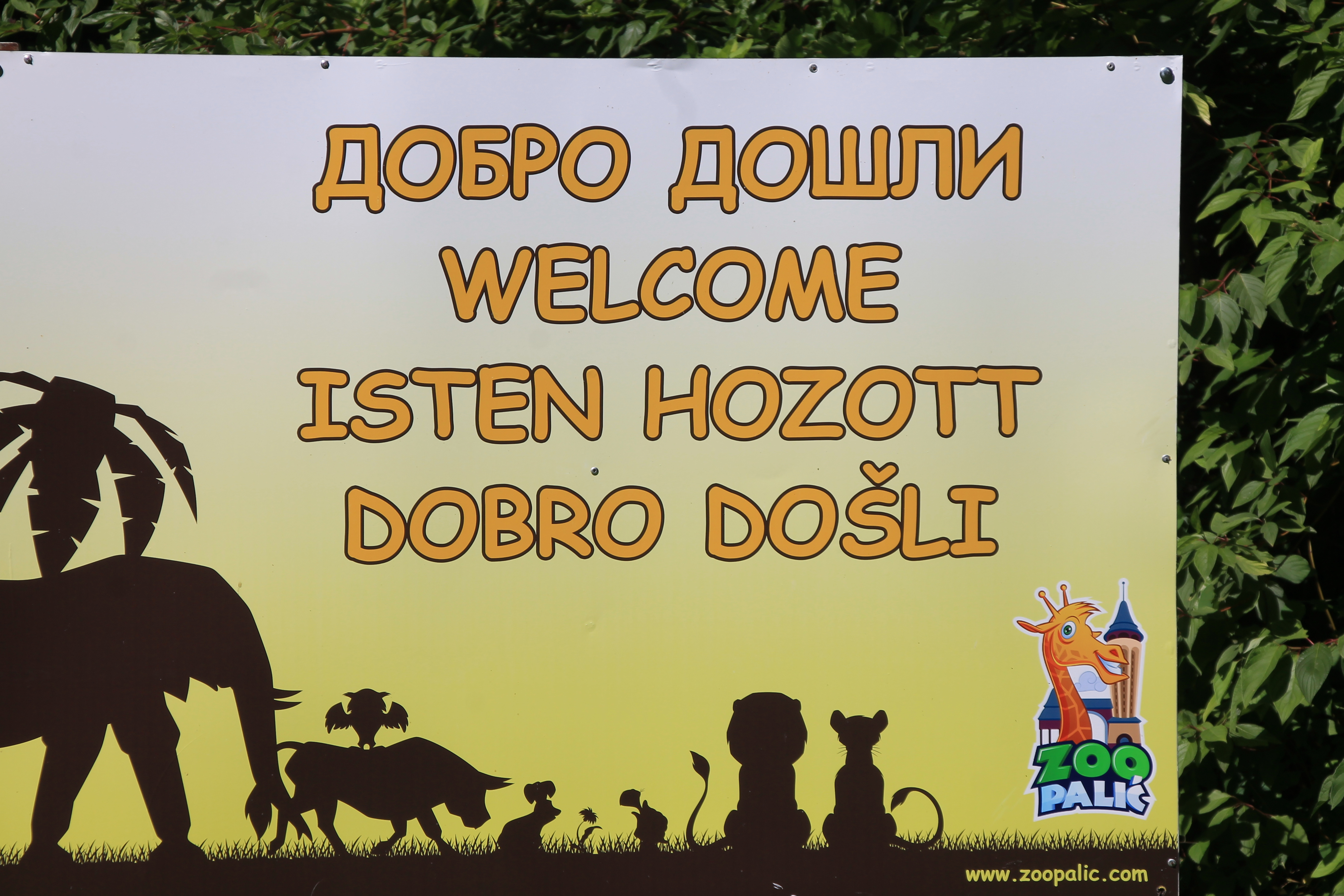

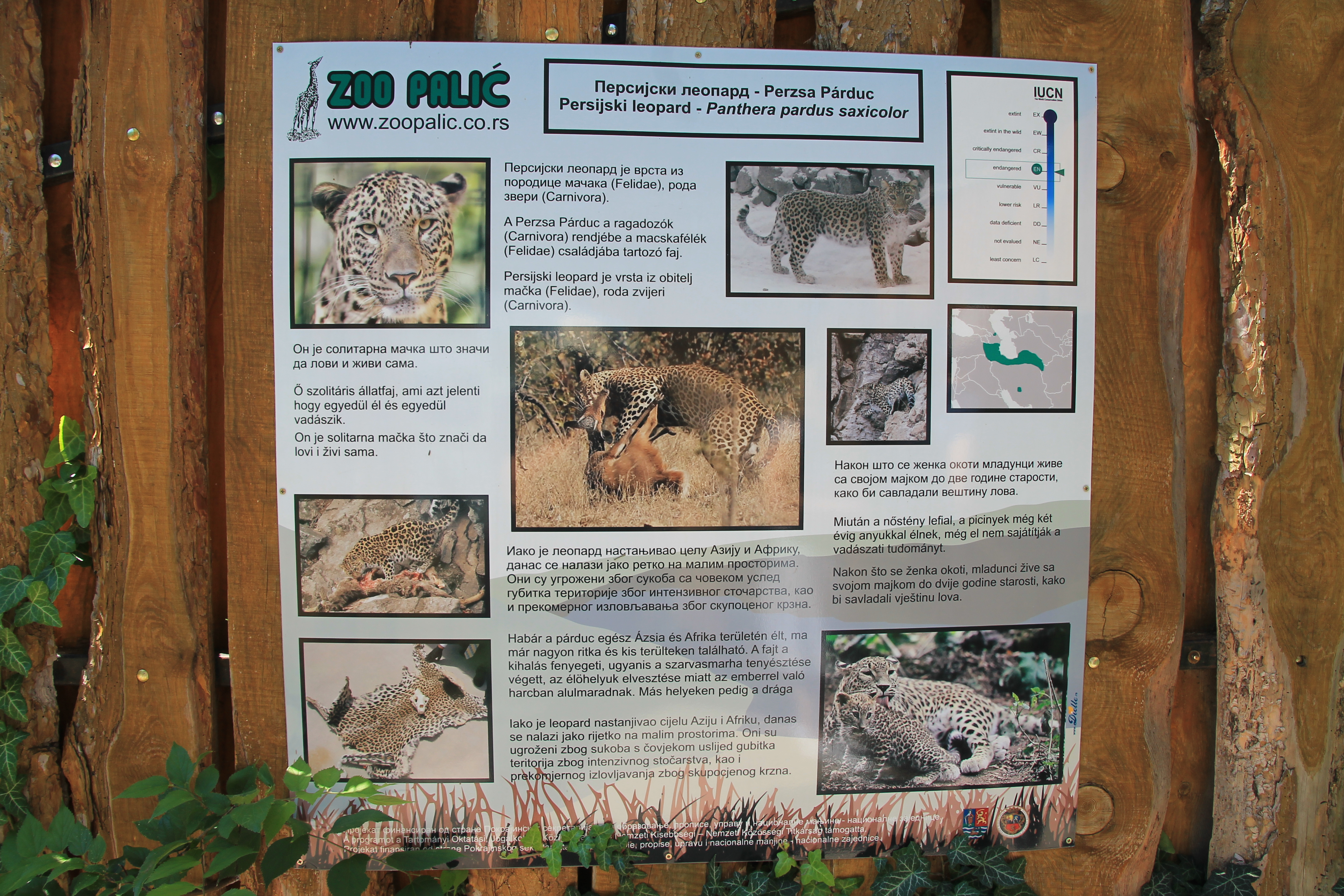

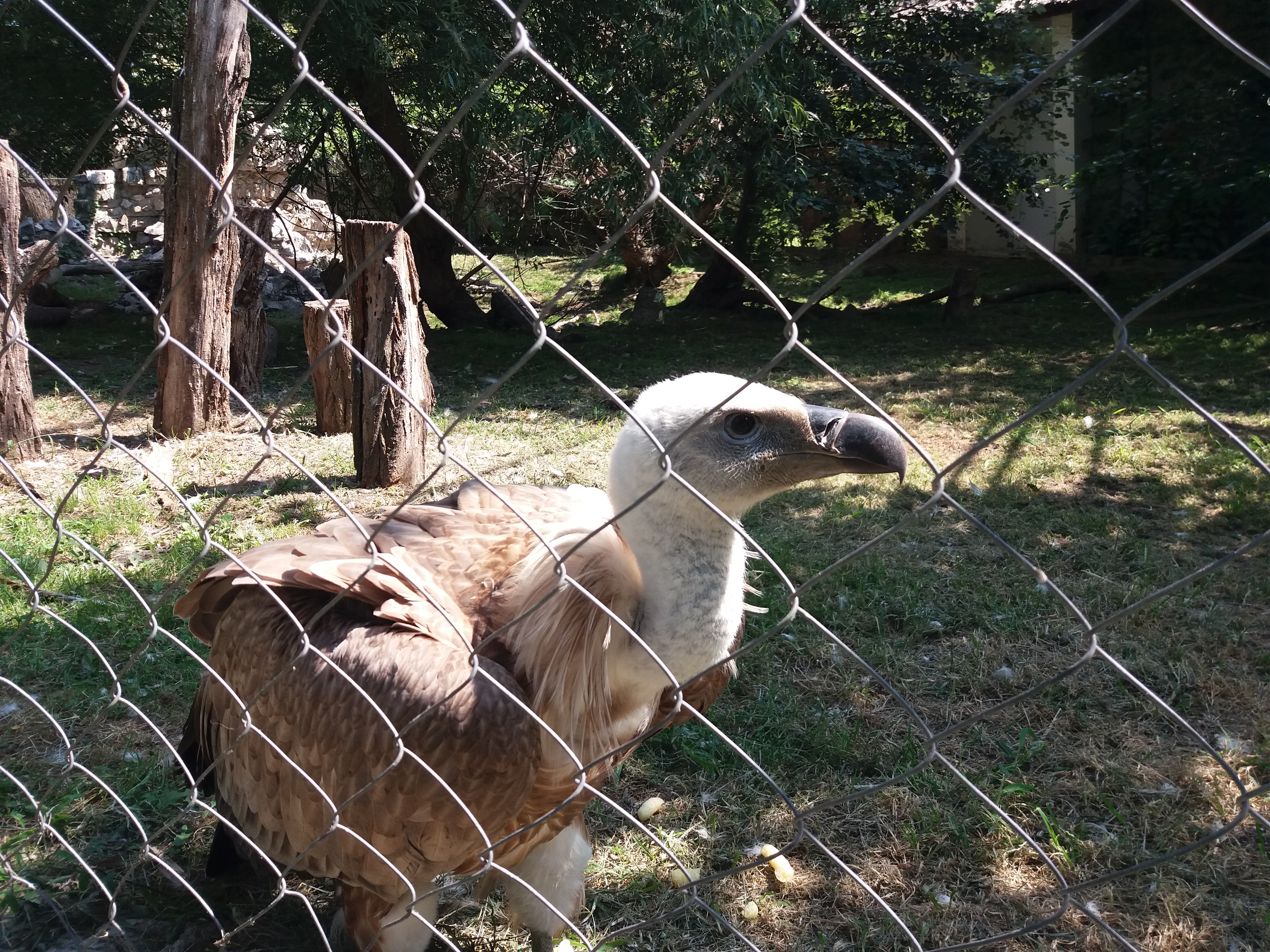

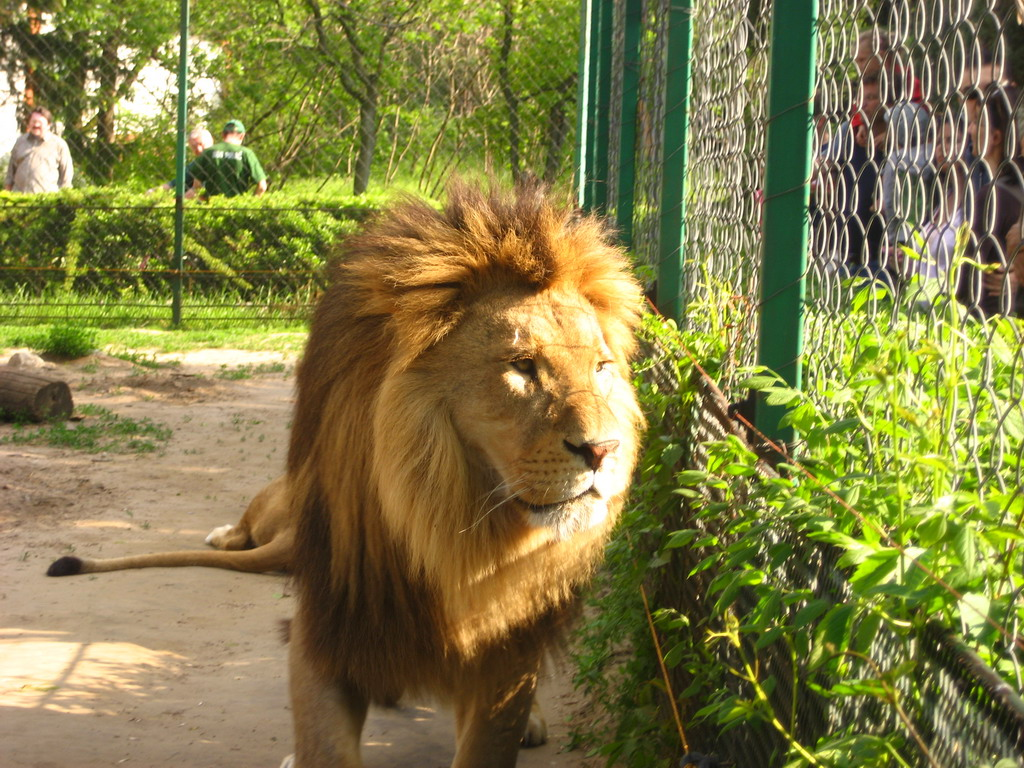

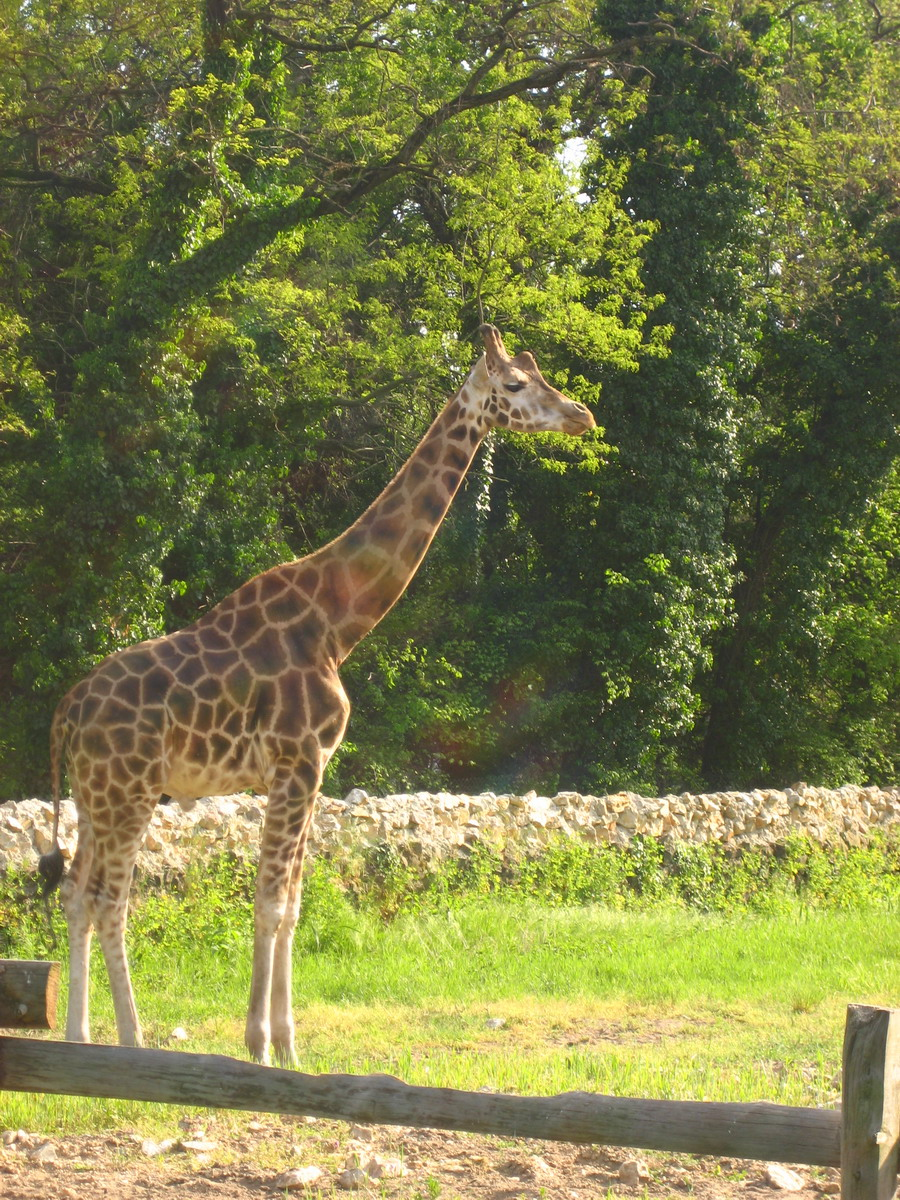

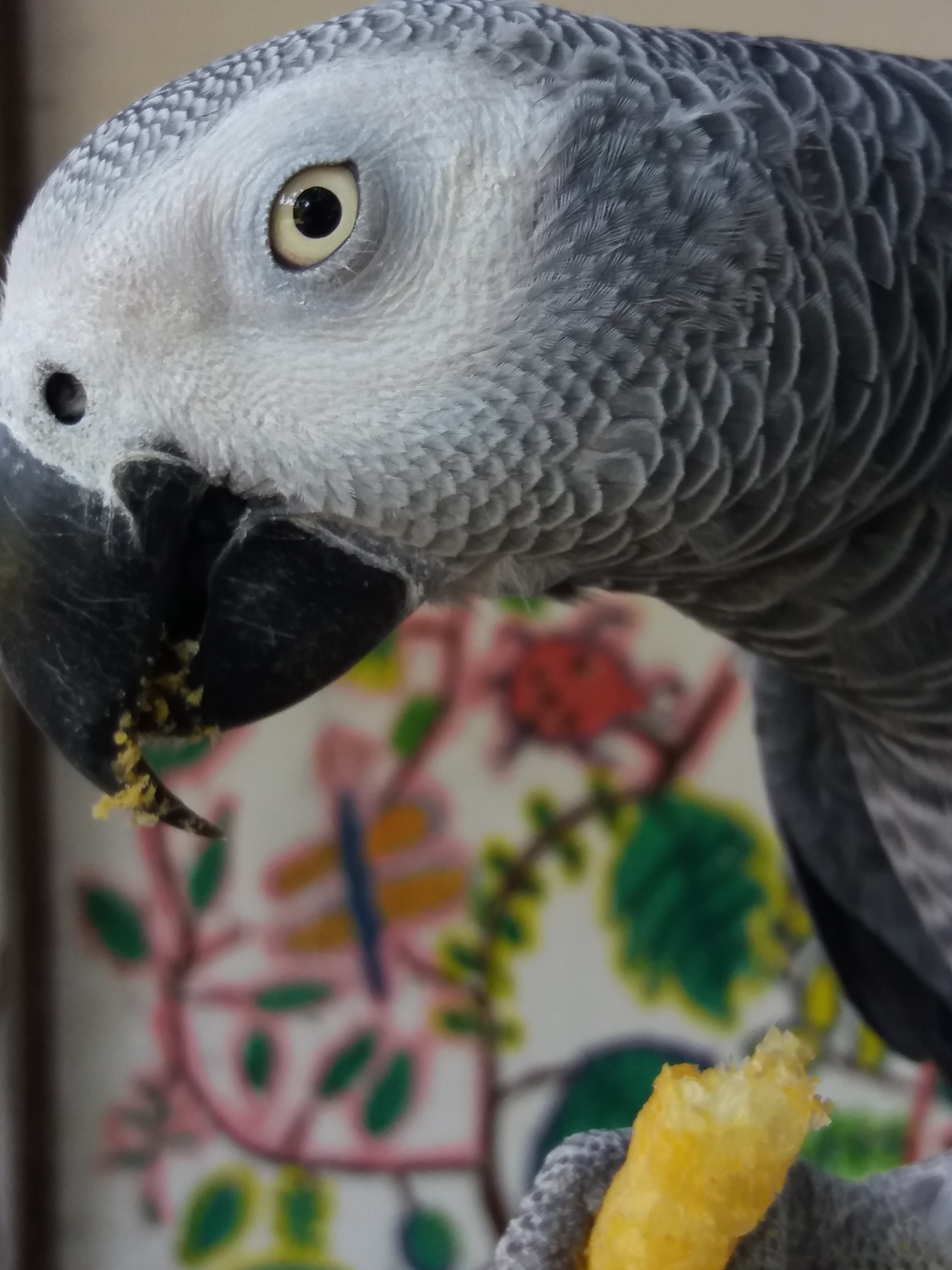

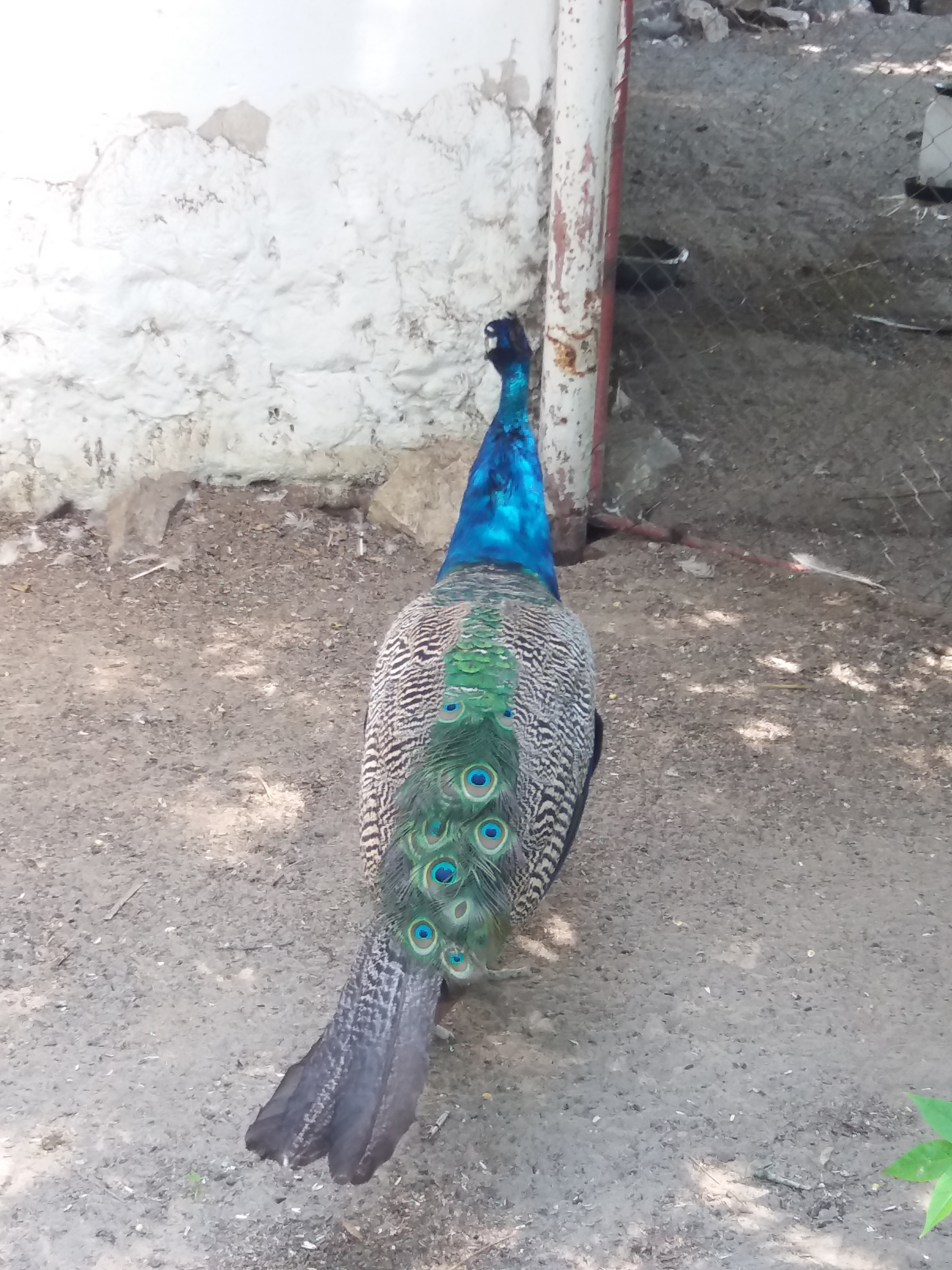

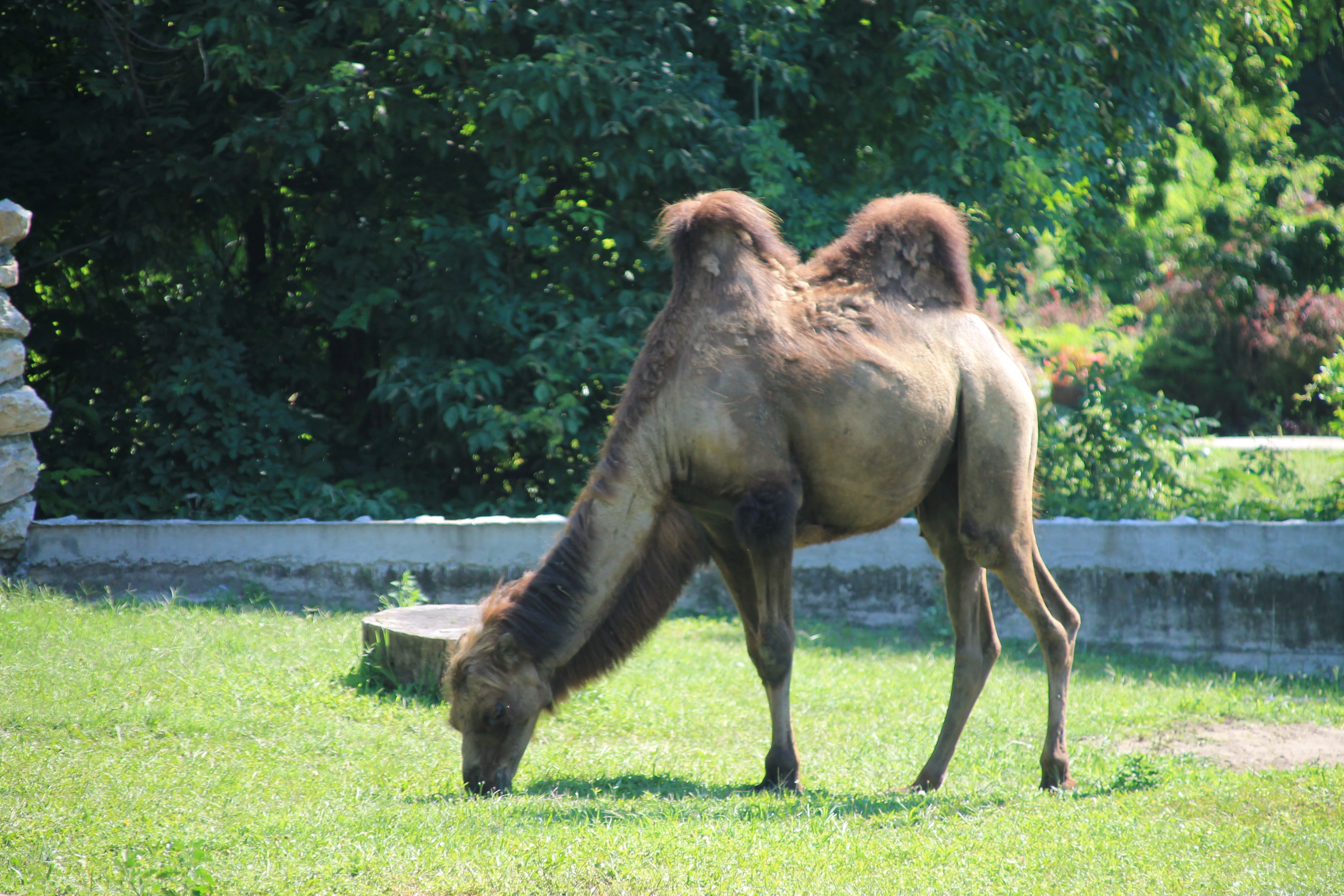

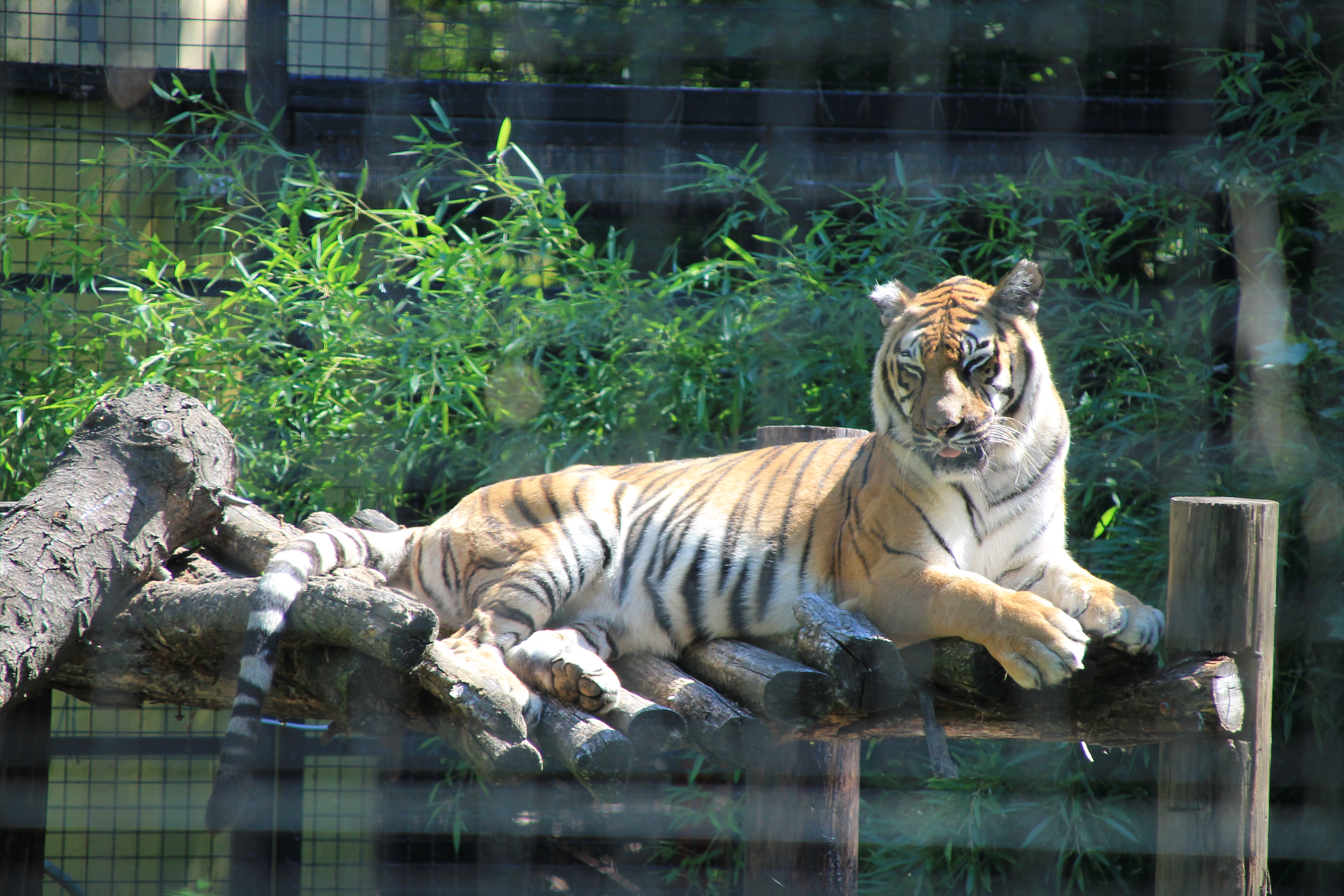

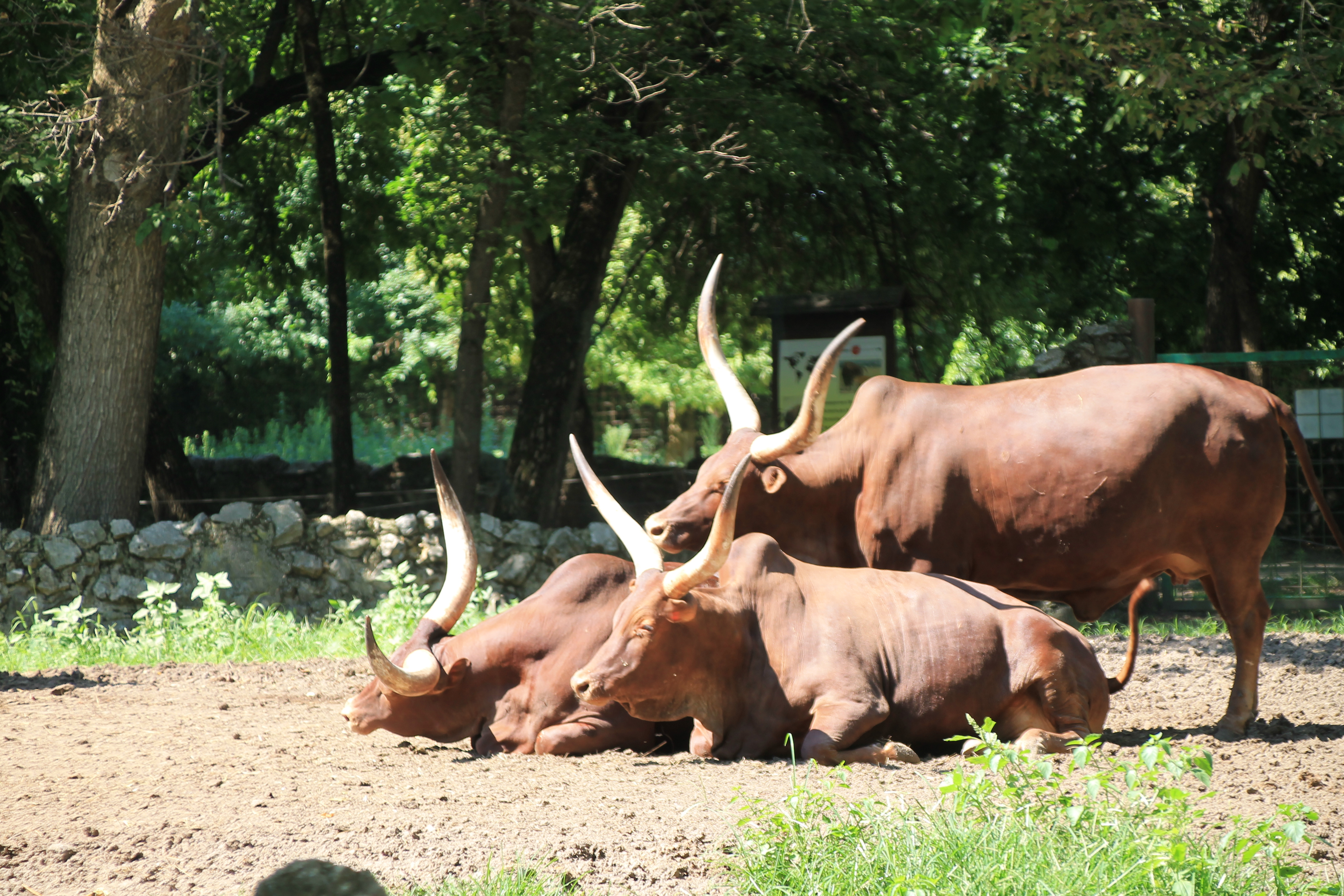

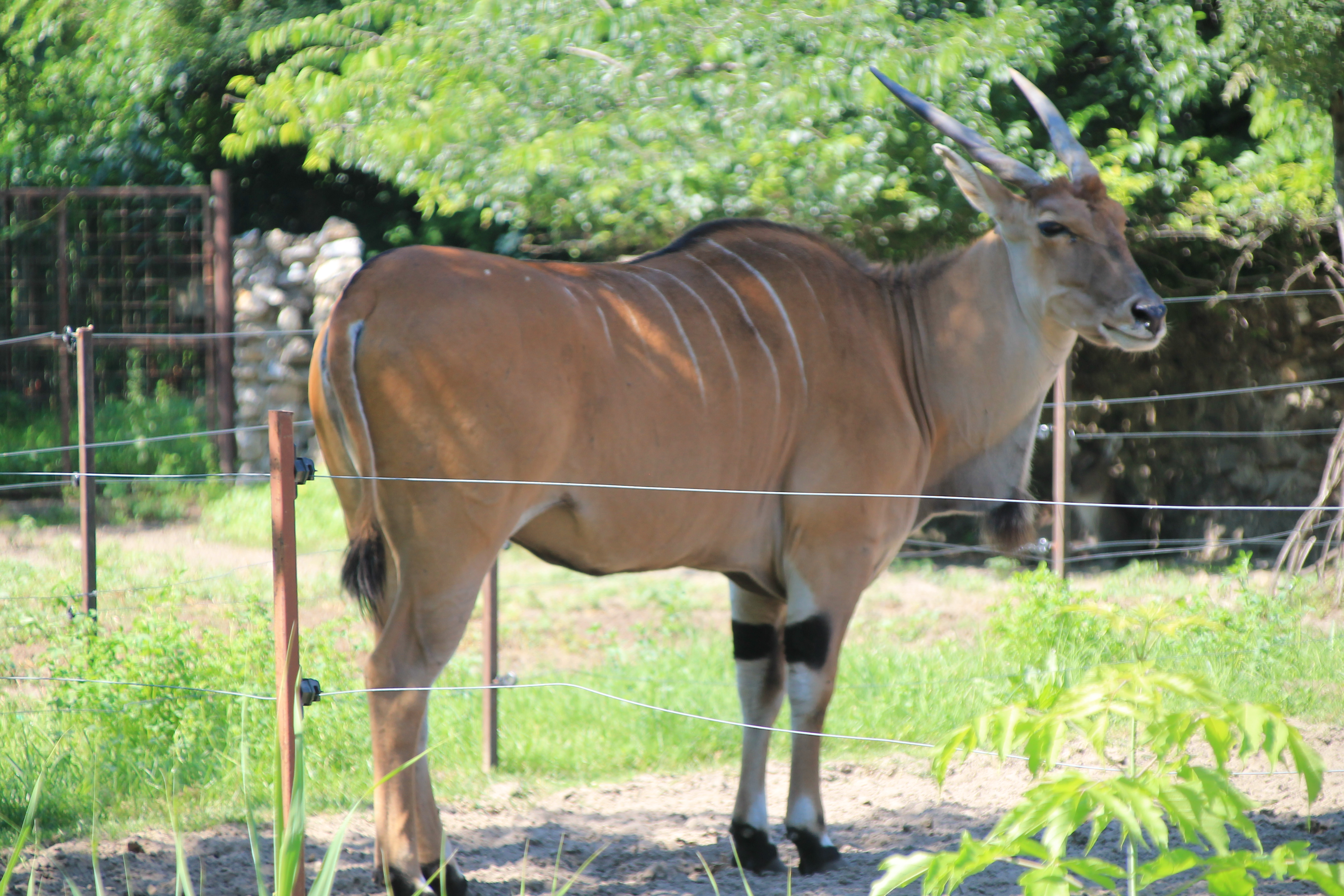

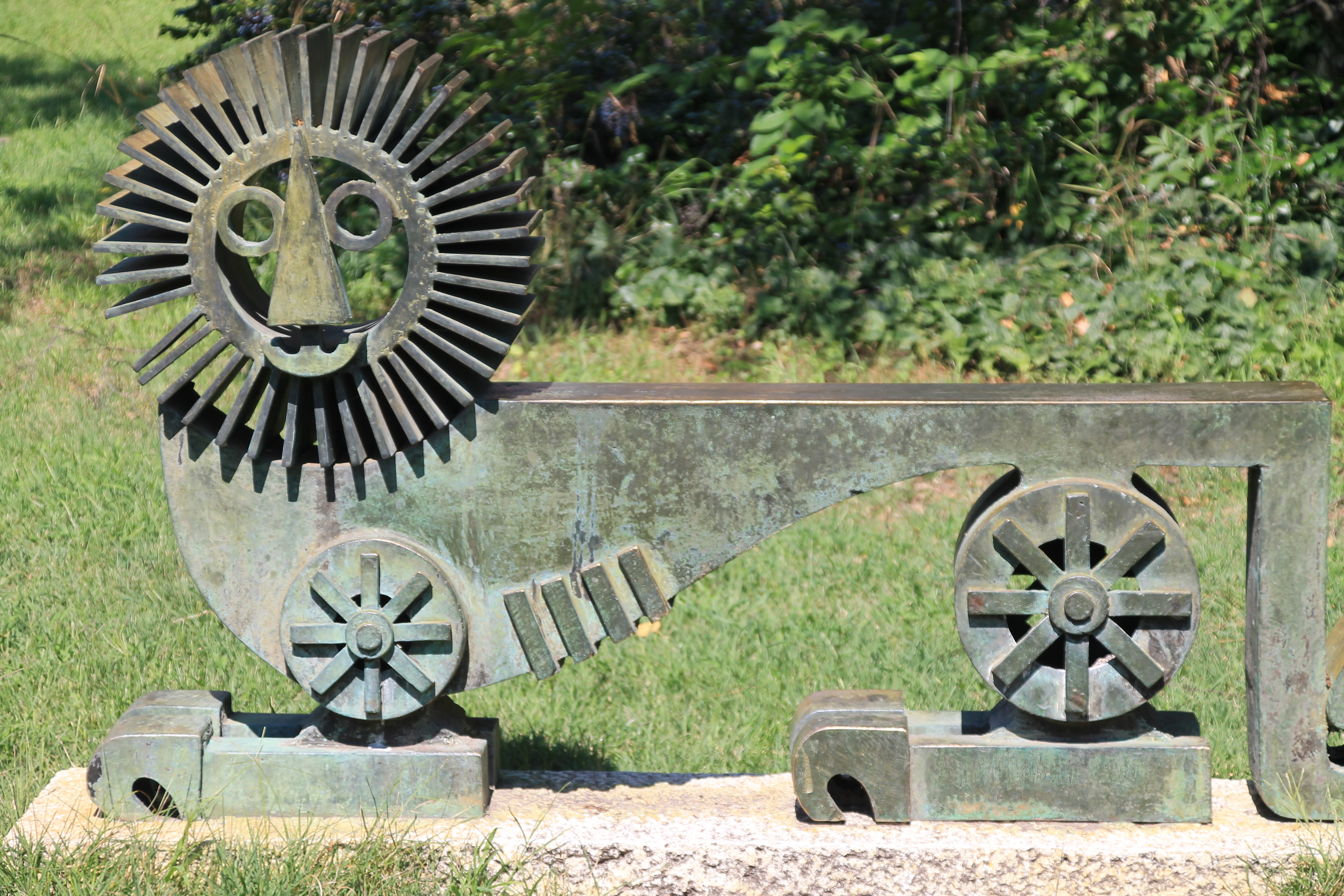

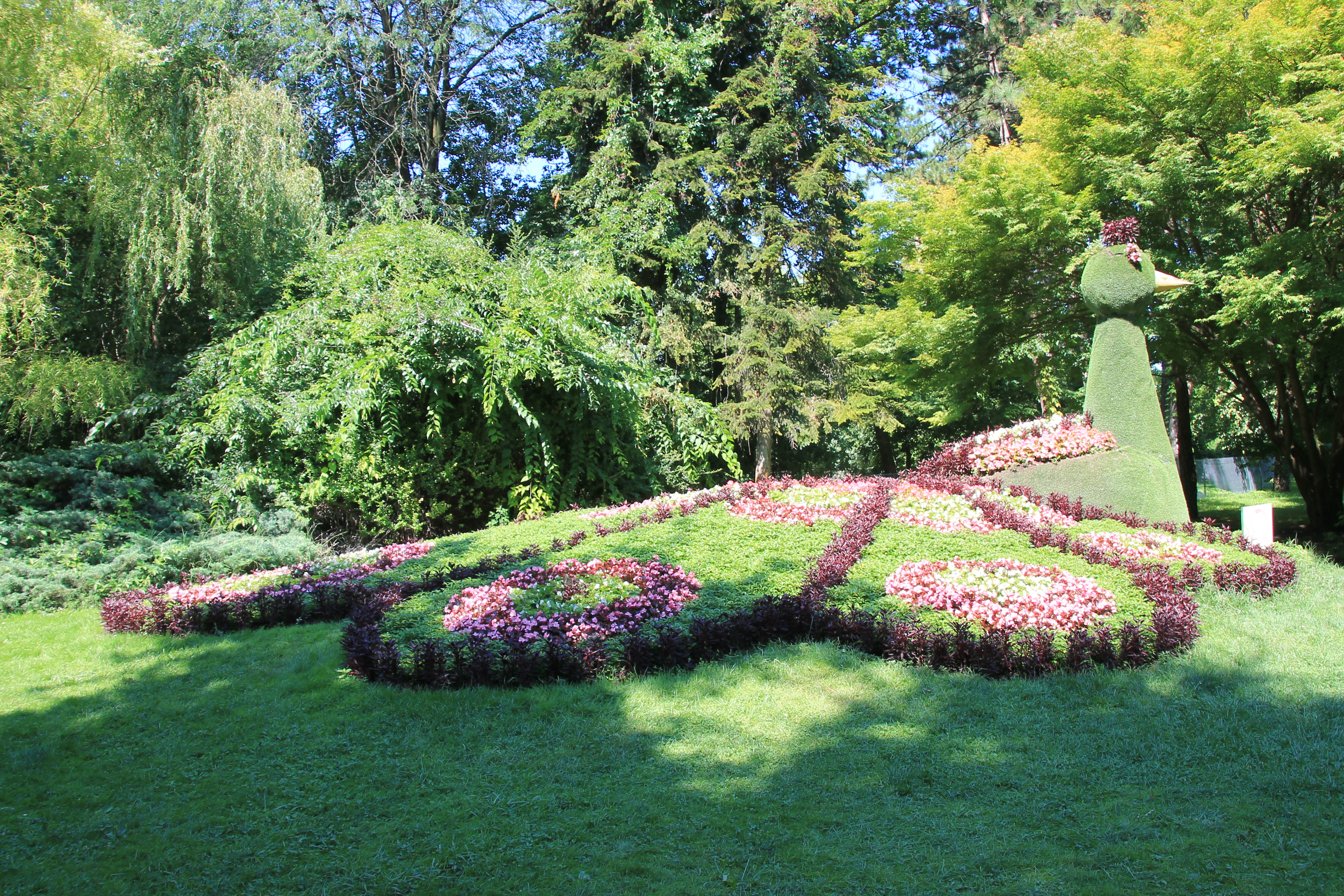
