= Lucavsala =

Island and neighbourhood in Riga, Latvia

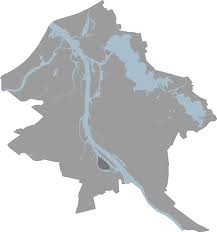
- Location of Lucavsala (dark green) in Riga

- Location within Latvia
- Interactive map of Lucavsala

Geography
- Location: Daugava River
- Coordinates: 56°55′27″N 24°07′06″E
- Area: 150 ha (370 acres)
- Highest elevation: 2 m (7 ft)

Administration
- Latvia

Demographics
- Population: 98
- Pop. density: 0.85/km^{2} (2.2/sq mi)

Additional information
- Official website: www.lucavsala.org

Lucavsala is an island located on the Daugava River in Riga, Latvia. It has a population of 98.

== Location and geography ==
Lucavsala is part of the Zemgale Suburb of Riga and the Salas neighborhood. It is located on the Daugava River, near Zaķusala Island, home of the Riga Radio and TV Tower. The Salu Bridge connects Lucavsala to the rest of Riga. Lucavsala features one street (Lucavsalas iela), thirteen private houses, and over six hundred small gardens. There are plans to build an ice hockey hall on Lucavsala.

Other features of Lucavsala include a monument for Russian soldiers who died during Crossing of the Düna during the Great Northern War, a swimming pool, and a wakepark. Lucavsala is a popular swimming place, with a relaxation and sports centre, as well as a rowing centre named after Ivans Klementjevs.

== History ==
Lucavsala was created in the 18th century by merging a lot of small islands into the long and narrow Jumpravsala. This occurred because of the building of a dam that was created to control the waters of Daugava. The dam also merged Vīberta island into the mainland and made Zvirgzdu island a peninsula, or half-island. In the former territory of the dam that merged many islands, Dienvidu bridge was built. The name "Lucavsala" comes from the name of a noble man named Klauss Lucavs, who lived on one of those islands. His mansion was named "Lucavmuiža". Since 1904, Lucavsala has been part of the Salas neighbourhood of Riga.

On 9 July 2014 the Riga City Council voted to sell 102.9 hectares (254 acres) of land on Lucavsala, citing the need to develop the island, which would cost more than the city government had resources to afford. Protestors gathered to show their opposition to the move, claiming the council did not have the authority to sell the land.

In 2015 and 2016 island was the home to the Kubana Festival (ru), a Russian contemporary music festival.

Since 2015, island has been a popular venue for concerts. On June 21, 2017 Foo Fighters performed at the park, and on July 27 Red Hot Chili Peppers performed at the park as a part of The Getaway World Tour. 2018 and 2019 performances include such artists as James Arthur, Ed Sheeran, Rammstein

== Gallery ==
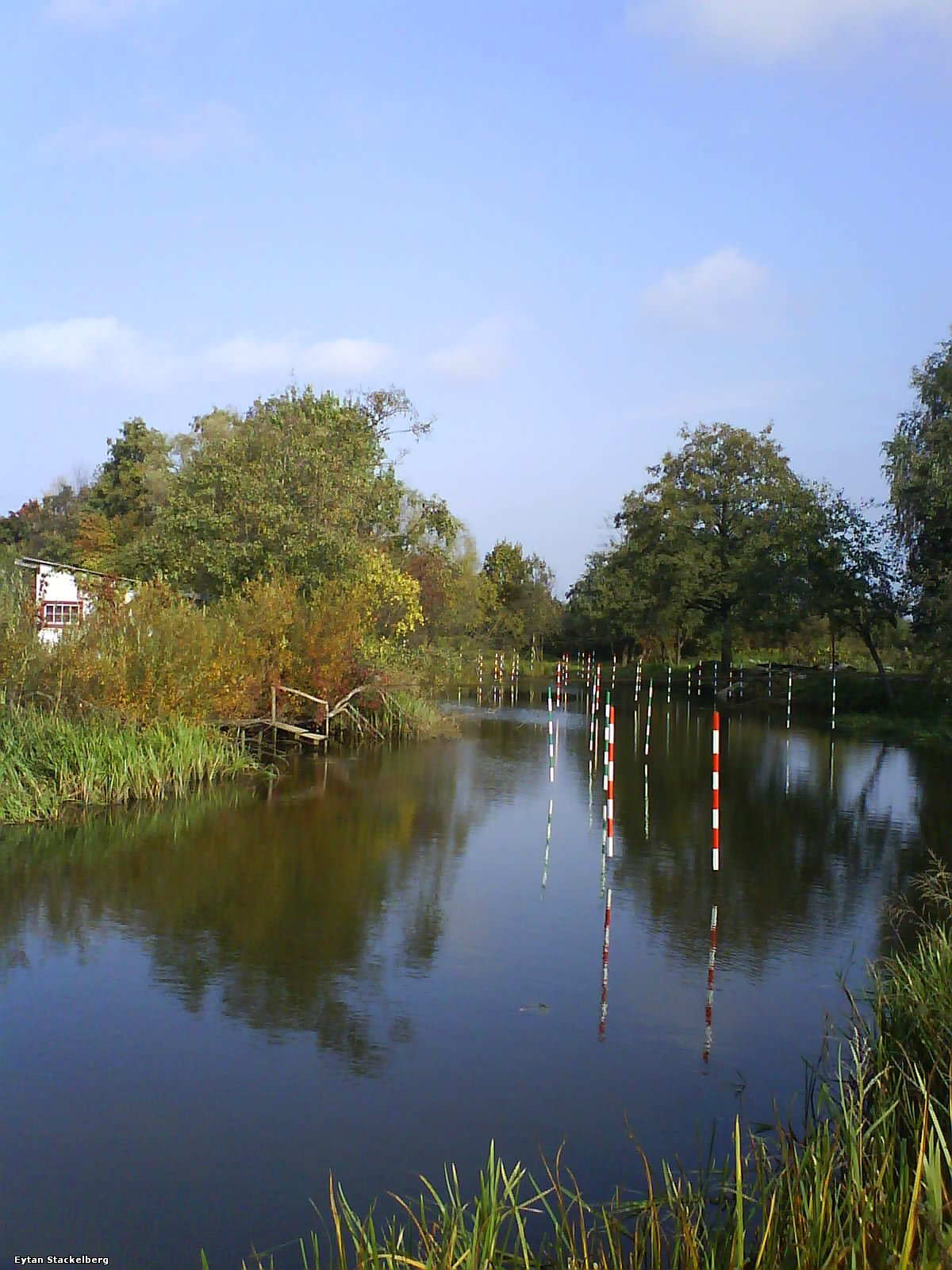
A small creek in Lucavsala

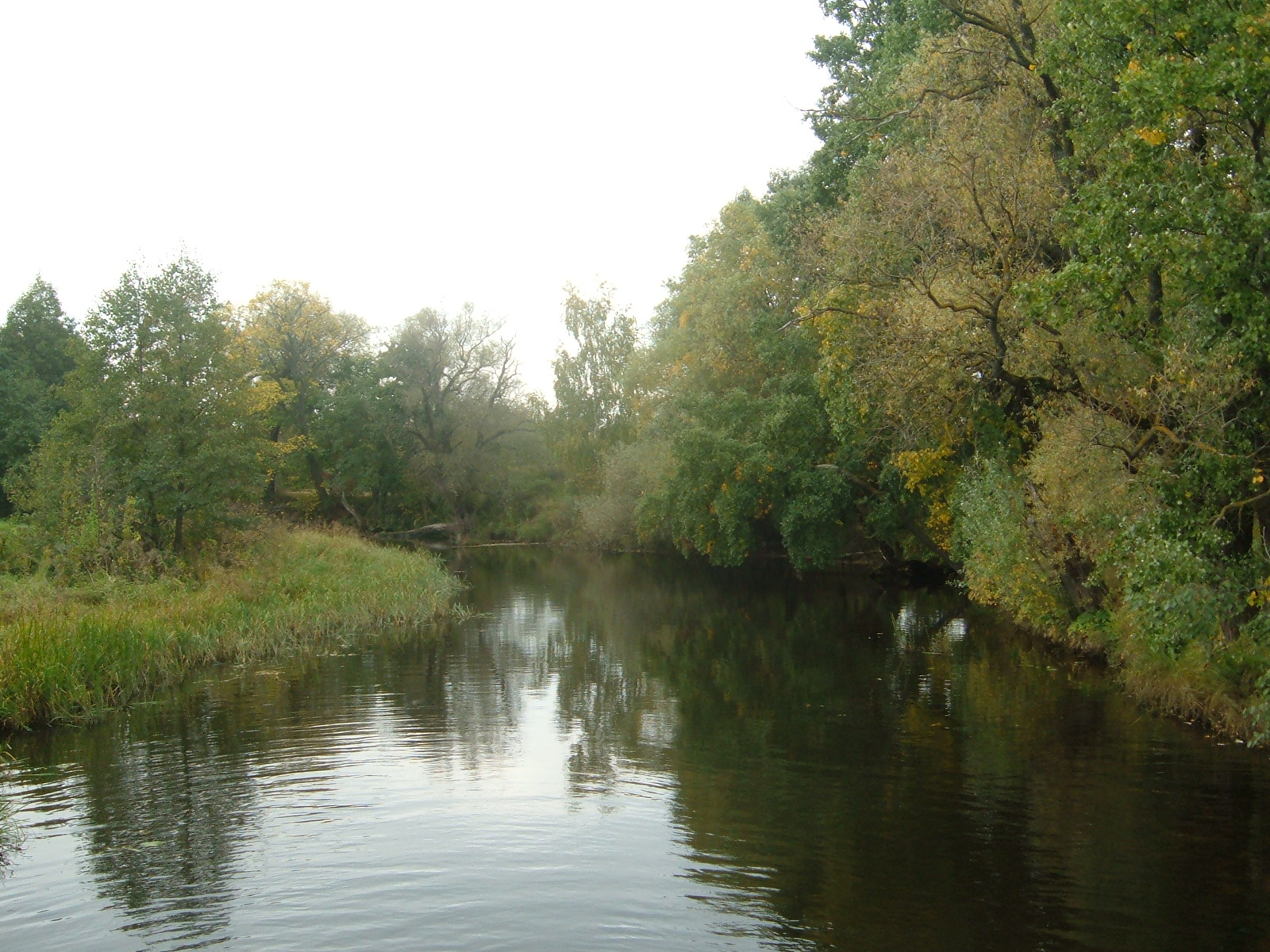
Gulf formed by Daugava River

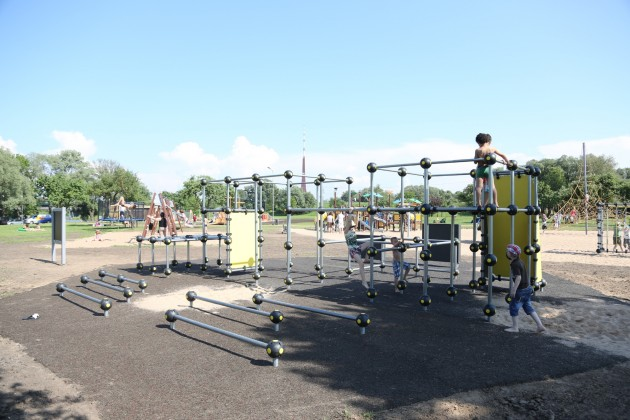
Relaxation and sports centre

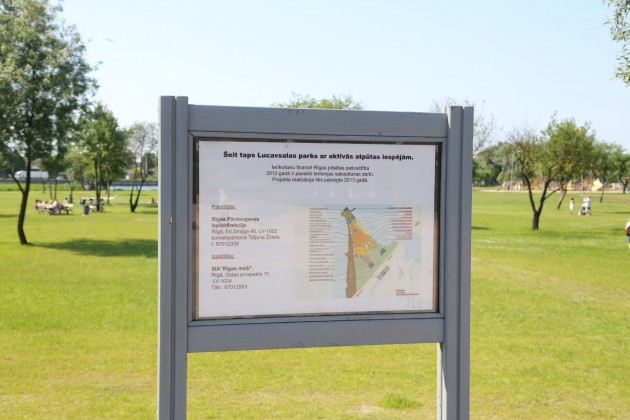
Map of park at the north of Lucavsala
