= Latvian State Radio and Television Centre =

Latvian state-owned telecommunications infrastructure company

- Riga Radio and TV Tower on Zaķusala
- Native name: VAS "Latvijas Valsts radio un televīzijas centrs"
- Type: State-owned joint-stock company
- Industry: Telecommunications, broadcasting infrastructure, data center services, trust services
- Founded: 26 June 1991
- Headquarters: Zemitāna iela 9 k-3, Riga, Latvia
- Services: Radio and television transmission, data transmission, data centre services, electronic identification and electronic-signature services
- Revenue: €29.8 million (2025)
- Net income: €10.9 million (2025)
- Total assets: 206,858,312 euro (2023)
- Owner: Republic of Latvia, represented by the Ministry of Transport
- Number of employees: 340 (2025)
- Website: www.lvrtc.lv/en/

The Latvian State Radio and Television Centre (Latvian: Latvijas Valsts radio un televīzijas centrs, abbreviated LVRTC) is a Latvian state-owned telecommunications infrastructure company based in Riga. The current legal entity, a state joint-stock company, was registered in Latvia on 26 June 1991. LVRTC operates broadcasting and telecommunications infrastructure and provides services including radio and television transmission, data transmission, data centres, cyber-security services and electronic identification and electronic-signature services.

The company is wholly owned by the Latvian state. Its shares are held by the Ministry of Transport, and Latvian law provides that the shares of the State stock company Latvian State Radio and Television Centre may not be alienated. In 2019, Public Broadcasting of Latvia described LVRTC as the main operator of Latvia's terrestrial radio and television broadcasting network and as one of the country's electronic-communications service providers.

== Legal status and governance ==
Lursoft records the company as Valsts akciju sabiedrība "Latvijas Valsts radio un televīzijas centrs", a joint-stock company with registration number 40003011203 and legal address at Zemitāna iela 9 k-3, Riga. Lursoft's previous-name data show that the legal entity has used several forms of the name since its 1991 registration, including the nonprofit state joint-stock company form in the 1990s and early 2000s.

In 2019, the Ministry of Transport appointed Edmunds Beļskis as chairman of the LVRTC board after a selection process. Public Broadcasting of Latvia reported at the time that the Ministry of Transport was the shareholder at the state-owned company, and that LVRTC was also the holder of the state shares in mobile operator Latvijas Mobilais Telefons.

LVRTC reported 2025 net turnover of €29.844 million, profit of €10.859 million and 340 employees. The same financial data page listed share capital of €111.7 million.

== Operations ==
LVRTC's traditional role is broadcasting and transmission infrastructure. It provides terrestrial radio and television broadcasting services and operates transmission infrastructure including the Riga Radio and TV Tower on Zaķusala. Public Broadcasting of Latvia reported in 2026 that LVRTC planned to sign a contract for the interior renovation of the Riga Radio and Television Tower, while the tower's operations were expected to continue during the works.

The company's service portfolio has broadened beyond broadcasting. LVRTC describes itself as providing radio and television transmission, optical-network services, data centre services, cyber-security services, time-synchronisation services, electronic-signature and electronic-identification services. A Mobile World Congress exhibitor profile described LVRTC as providing digital infrastructure and technology services, including optical connectivity, data centres and trust services for digital identity and transactions.

LVRTC also operates digital infrastructure connected with Latvian government and public-sector services. In 2025, LSM reported that Latvia's national cloud-computing infrastructure was based on four centres, including the Latvian State Radio and Television Centre, and that those four centres together hosted about half of the information systems used in public administration, according to the State Audit Office.

== Rural broadband infrastructure ==
LVRTC has been a central implementing body in Latvia's rural broadband programme. The Organisation for Economic Co-operation and Development's 2021 review Going Digital in Latvia stated that, within the "Next Generation Network for Rural Areas" programme, LVRTC was responsible for building open-access middle-mile infrastructure in identified "white areas" where retail providers have wholesale access. The OECD report listed total funding of €72.7 million for the rural broadband programme.

The OECD described the first stage as completed in August 2015, with 177 access points and 1,813 km of fibre. It stated that the second stage was planned to deploy a further 220 access points and 2,000 km of fibre, and that LVRTC had signed contracts of €40.7 million for the deployment of 1,950.6 km.

The broadband programme also received independent criticism. In 2020, Latvia's State Audit Office reported that the middle-mile broadband network deployed by the government was underused and had made little contribution to improving household internet access. The audit office stated that 3,000 km of middle-mile cables had been installed, but that neither the Ministry of Transport nor LVRTC had access to information on how much the leased network was used to provide household internet services and how much it was used for other purposes.

In 2023, the Latvian EU-funds portal reported that LVRTC was recovering previously withheld ERDF funding connected with broadband-network construction. According to that report, the second phase of the broadband project had built and put into operation 1,948 km of optical-cable network lines and 261 middle-mile access points, reaching 176 "white zones".

== Electronic identification and e-signature services ==
LVRTC develops and maintains Latvia's national e-signature and electronic-identification tools, including eParaksts Mobile. Signicat's developer documentation describes eParaksts Mobile as an electronic identification method available in Latvia and states that it is developed and maintained by LVRTC.

Use of the eParaksts tools has increased in Latvian public and commercial digital services. LSM reported in February 2025, citing LVRTC, that Latvian residents had used national electronic-identification tools for e-identity authentication more than 22.4 million times in the previous year, a 60 percent increase from the year before. The same report stated that the mobile app eParaksts Mobile accounted for 85 percent of all eParaksts tool uses.

== Policy and regulatory context ==
The European Commission's digital-connectivity policy page for Latvia describes the policy goal of equal and high-quality electronic-communications services throughout the country and identifies the Ministry of Transport, the Ministry of Smart Administration and Regional Development, the Public Utilities Commission and the Competition Council as responsible institutions in Latvia's connectivity-policy framework.

The European Commission's 2011 state-aid decision on Latvia's next-generation network for rural areas assessed public funding for broadband deployment in areas without commercial next-generation access investment. The decision described the Latvian measure as targeting "white NGA areas" and assessed the scheme under EU state-aid rules for rapid broadband deployment.
