= Steel bridge =

Type of bridge

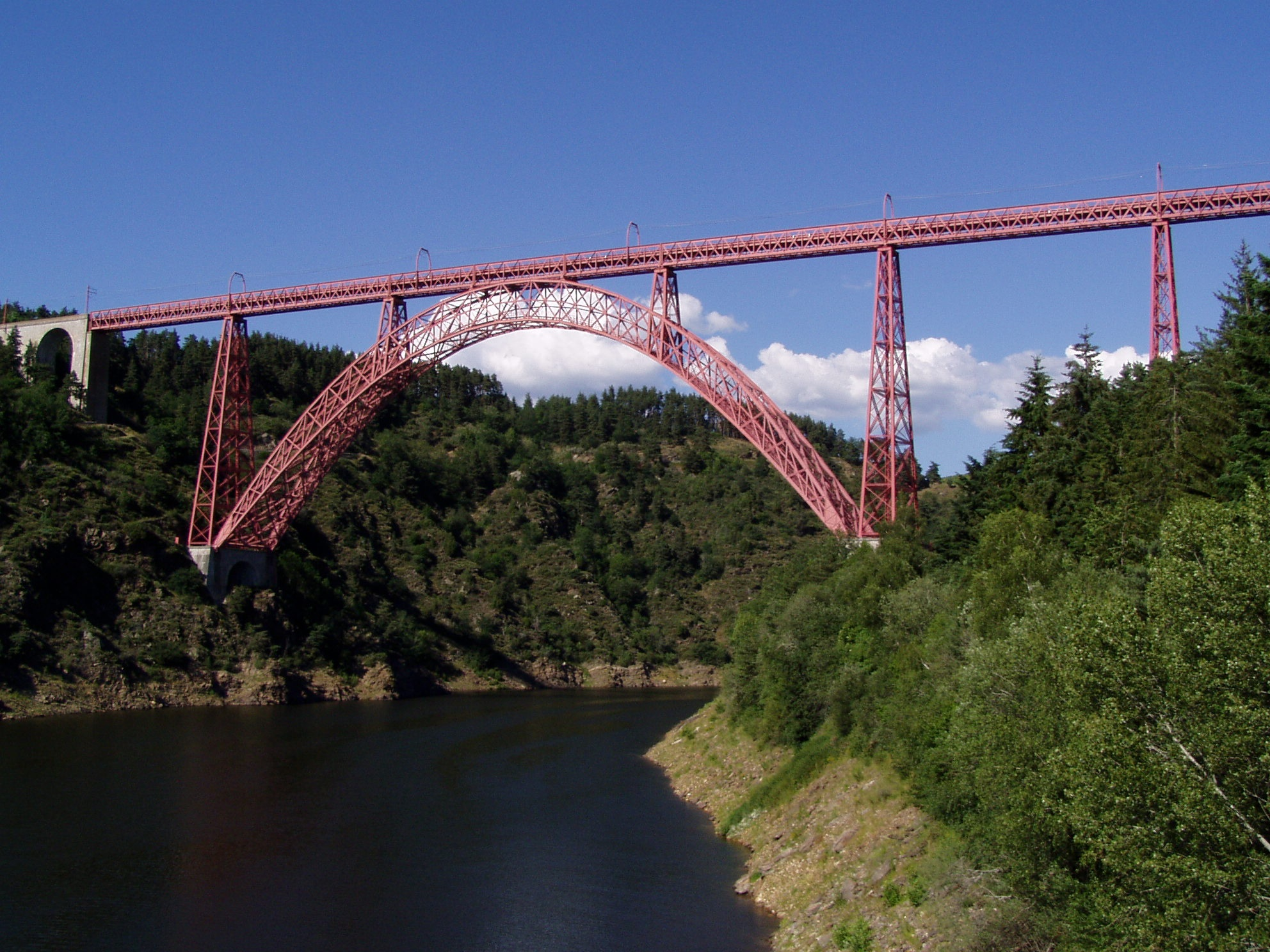
The Garabit Viaduct, a metallic arch bridge

A metallic bridge is a bridge with a structure made of metal, typically iron, cast iron, or steel.

== History ==
The first metallic bridge was constructed from cast iron in England. Known as the Iron Bridge, it was built in 1779 by Abraham Darby III over the River Severn at Coalbrookdale. The bridge has a span of 30.5 metres (100 ft) and a total length of 60 metres (200 ft), standing 30 metres (98 ft) above the river.

In France, the first metallic bridge was the Pont des Arts in Paris, constructed in 1803 by Louis-Alexandre de Cessart and Jacques Dillon. The pinnacle of cast iron bridges was reached with the Pont du Carrousel, built in Paris in 1834 by Antoine-Rémy Polonceau.

Suspension bridges made of iron began to develop in the United States in 1810. The widespread use of metallic bridges grew with advancements in steel production techniques, coinciding with the expansion of railway networks. This golden age of metallic bridges continued until World War I, despite the emergence of reinforced concrete in France by 1898.

== Materials ==
The steels used in bridge construction are low-alloy iron-carbon alloys. For aesthetic or safety reasons, other steel types, such as Corten steel or stainless steel, may be used.

Steel Grade	Yield Strength (MPa)	Elongation at Break (%)
Mild Steel	235–355	>15
High-Strength Steel	355–690	>15
Ultra-High-Strength Steel (for cables)	1200–1400	1.5–2.5

For safety, steel in bridges is designed to operate well below its yield strength. Material fatigue limits stresses to approximately half the yield strength, around 120 megapascals (17,000 psi) for mild steel and 180 megapascals (26,000 psi) for high-strength steel. Fatigue strength is a critical factor in structural calculations. Other factors, such as temperature, stress corrosion cracking, and performance in saline environments, also influence material selection.

== Profiles ==
Steel profiles used in bridges include:

Designation	Width (mm)
Flat	30–180 millimetres (7.1 in)
Wide Flat	200–1,000 millimetres (39 in)
Sheet	800–3,600 millimetres (140 in)

Common profiles include angle iron, U-shaped beams, and T-beams.

Unequal angle iron

I-beam

U-shaped beam

== Assembly methods ==
Steel assembly methods include bolting, riveting, and welding.

Bolts and rivets secure components through clamping force. Bolts, installed cold, are used for temporary assemblies or in cases where rivets are unsuitable. A bolt consists of a forged head, a threaded shank, and a movable nut screwed onto the threaded portion.

Rivets, installed hot, were historically the primary assembly method in structural steelwork. A rivet has a factory-made head and a shank; the second head is formed by forging the protruding shank while hot, creating a strong clamping force upon cooling.

Welding joins steel by melting and fusing components using coated steel rods (electrodes) that melt under the high temperature of an electric arc. Modern metallic bridges are typically welded, with rivets largely obsolete. Bolts remain in use for emergency bridges, which are assembled rapidly from prefabricated parts.

== Metallic beams ==
Metallic beams typically have an I-shaped profile, though U-shaped or box-section profiles are used when height is limited.

=== Solid web beams ===
Solid web beams consist of one or more vertical webs and horizontal flanges (or wings) on either side. These beams can be hot-rolled (I-beams for smaller sizes) or assembled cold from flat plates through welding (welded reconstituted beams, or PRSs) or, historically, riveting with angle irons.

Flanges, with or without angle irons, form the beam’s chords in welded or rolled structures.

Riveted solid web beam

Riveted U-shaped beam

Riveted box-section beam

Welded reconstituted beam

=== Truss beams ===
Truss beams, or triangulated beams, consist of chords connected not by a web but by vertical or inclined bars forming a triangulated framework. The arrangement of bars varies depending on the triangulation system used.

Common truss systems include:

Pratt truss

Town truss

Double Town truss

K truss

Warren truss

Warren truss with verticals

Howe truss

Cross of Saint Andrew (Pratt and Howe combination)

Compound truss

Vierendeel truss (non-triangulated)

== Beam connections ==
=== Riveted connections ===
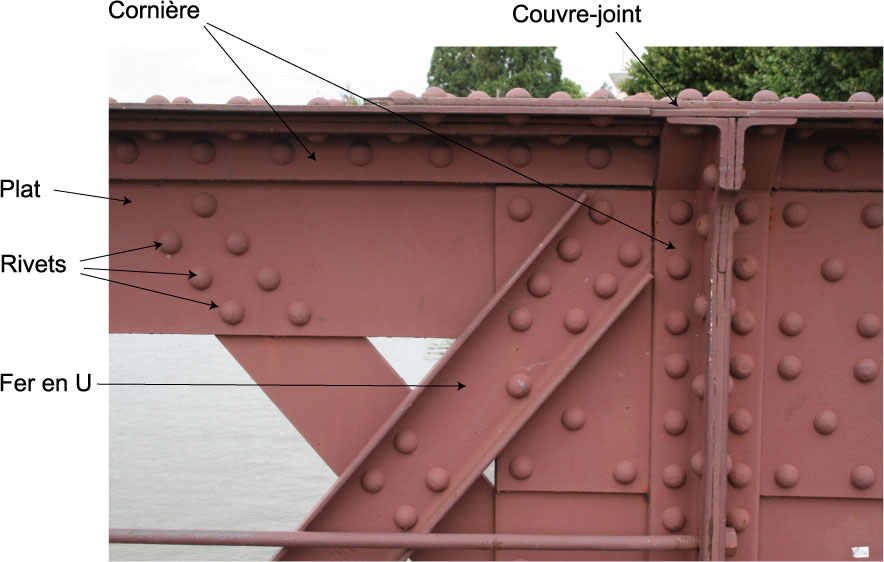

Riveted connections were standard before welding became prevalent. Both straight beam and truss bridges used rivets. A typical truss connection includes vertical and horizontal members made of angle irons and plates riveted together, with inclined members using U-shaped beams. Cover plates, or gussets, are added at joints to enhance rigidity.

=== Welded connections ===
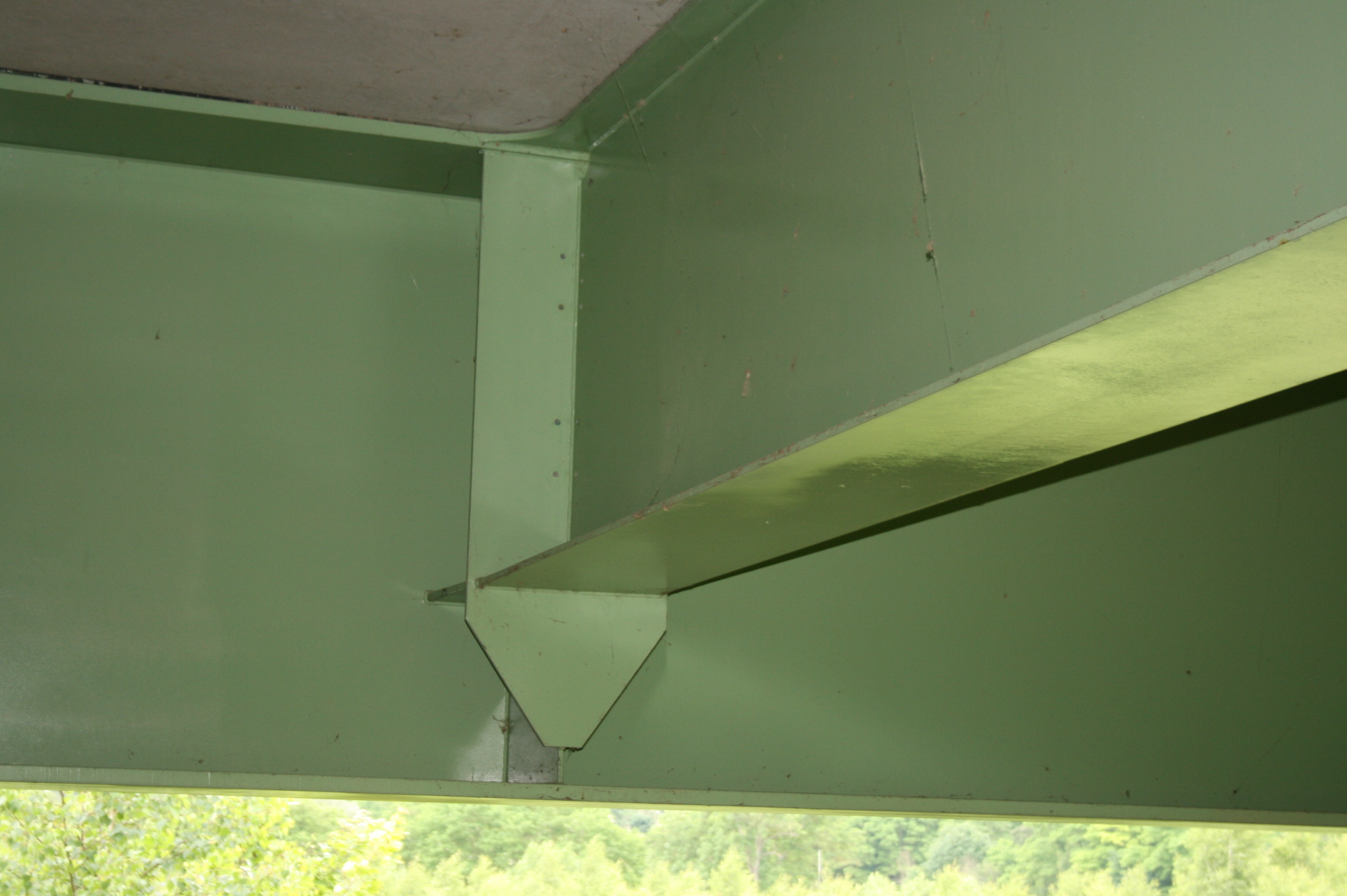

Modern metallic connections typically involve welding, as seen in solid web beams. A transverse beam, or cross-girder, is welded to a longitudinal beam, or stringer. Vertical stiffeners, often terminating in a gusset, reinforce the assembly.

== Types of metallic bridges ==
=== Straight beam bridges ===
Depending on the beam structure, these include single box girder bridges (with voussoirs), twin-girder bridges, ribbed bridges, lenticular bridges, and truss bridges.

=== Suspension bridges ===
In a suspension bridge, the beam is called the stiffening girder, typically made of a metallic truss.

Three parameters define a suspension bridge:

- Its span, equal to its length (L) for a single-span bridge without approach spans.
- Its sag (f), the distance between the midpoint of the chord connecting the pylon tops and the midpoint of the suspension cable.
- The height (H) of the stiffening girder, typically between L/80 and L/100.

For small to medium spans, the relationship between span and sag is generally $f = \frac{L}{9}$

== Detailed classification ==
Family	Category	Image
Beam Bridges	Trestle	
Beam Bridges	Twin-girder composite	
Beam Bridges	Multi-girder composite	
Beam Bridges	Box girder composite	
Beam Bridges	Orthotropic deck	
Beam Bridges	Straight truss	
Beam Bridges	Cantilever truss	
Beam Bridges	Encased beams	
Arch Bridges	Suspended-deck metallic arch	
Arch Bridges	Intermediate-deck metallic arch	
Arch Bridges	Supported-deck metallic arch	
Arch Bridges	Truss metallic arch	
Arch Bridges	Lenticular	
Arch Bridges	Bowstring	
Arch Bridges	Strut-framed	
Cable-stayed		
Suspension Bridges	Chain suspension	
Suspension Bridges	Concrete deck with stiffening girder	
Suspension Bridges	Orthotropic deck suspension	

== See also ==
- Suspension bridge
- Cable-stayed bridge
- Steel
- Structural engineering
- Bridge
- Fatigue (material)
- Welding
- Iron Bridge (disambiguation)

== Bibliography ==
- Bruyère, Louis (1823). Études relatives à l'art des constructions, tome 1, Recueil III, Ponts en fer [Studies Related to the Art of Construction, Volume 1, Collection III, Iron Bridges] (in French). Paris: Bance aîné. pp. 3–8.
- Chaix, J. (1890). Traité des ponts, Deuxième partie, Ponts en charpente, métalliques et suspendus, tome 1 [Treatise on Bridges, Second Part, Timber, Metallic, and Suspension Bridges, Volume 1] (in French). Paris: Fanchon et Artus.
- Chaix, J. (1891). Traité des ponts, Deuxième partie, Ponts en charpente, métalliques et suspendus, tome 2 [Treatise on Bridges, Second Part, Timber, Metallic, and Suspension Bridges, Volume 2] (in French). Paris: Fanchon et Artus.
- Deschamps, Henri (1908). Les principes de la construction des charpentes métalliques et leur application aux ponts à poutres droites, combles, supports et chevalements [Principles of Metallic Framework Construction and Their Application to Straight Beam Bridges, Roofs, Supports, and Frameworks] (in French). Paris and Liège: Librairie polytechnique Ch. Béranger.
- Ciolina, François (1979a). Construction métallique, tome 1, Conception des structures [Metallic Construction, Volume 1, Structural Design] (in French). Paris: Éditions Eyrolles. ISBN 978-2-212-00676-6.
- Ciolina, François (1979b). Construction métallique, tome 2, Ouvrages d'art [Metallic Construction, Volume 2, Engineering Structures] (in French). Paris: Éditions Eyrolles. ISBN 978-2-212-00677-3.
- Leonhardt, Fritz (1982). Brucken Bridges: Asthetik und Gestaltung [Brucken Bridges: Aesthetics and design] (in German). London: The Architectural Press. ISBN 0-85139-764-6.
- Troyano, Leonardo Fernández (2003). Bridge Engineering: A Global Perspective. London: Thomas Telford. ISBN 978-0-7277-3215-6.
- Lebet, Manfred A.; Hirt (2009). Ponts en acier : conception et dimensionnement des ponts métalliques et mixtes acier-béton [Steel bridges: design and dimensioning of steel and steel-concrete composite bridges] (in French). Lausanne: Presses polytechniques universitaires romandes. ISBN 978-2-88074-765-7.
- Van Rooden, Clementine (2013). "Ponts historiques en acier" [Historic Steel Bridges] (PDF). Steeldoc (in French) (3+04/2013). Centre suisse de la construction métallique SZS. Archived from the original (PDF) on April 11, 2016.
