= Chakzam =

Chakzam or Chaksam or Jagsam means "iron bridge" in the Tibetan language (Tibetan: ལྕགས་ཟམ, Wylie: lcags zam, THL: chak zam, ZYPY: jagsam). It may refer to:

- Chushul Chakzam near Lhasa, one of the first bridges of its kind built by Thang Tong Gyalpo in 1430
- Jagsamka Township in Riwoqê County
- Luding County in Sichuan province, whose Tibetan name is Chagsam due to the iron bridge
- Thang Tong Gyalpo, also known as Chakzampa, a Bhutanese lama who built 58 iron bridges

== See also ==
- Iron Bridge (disambiguation)
