= Salas, Riga =

Neighborhood of Riga, Latvia

Coordinates: 56.9264°N 24.1211°E

Salas
- Neighbourhood of Riga
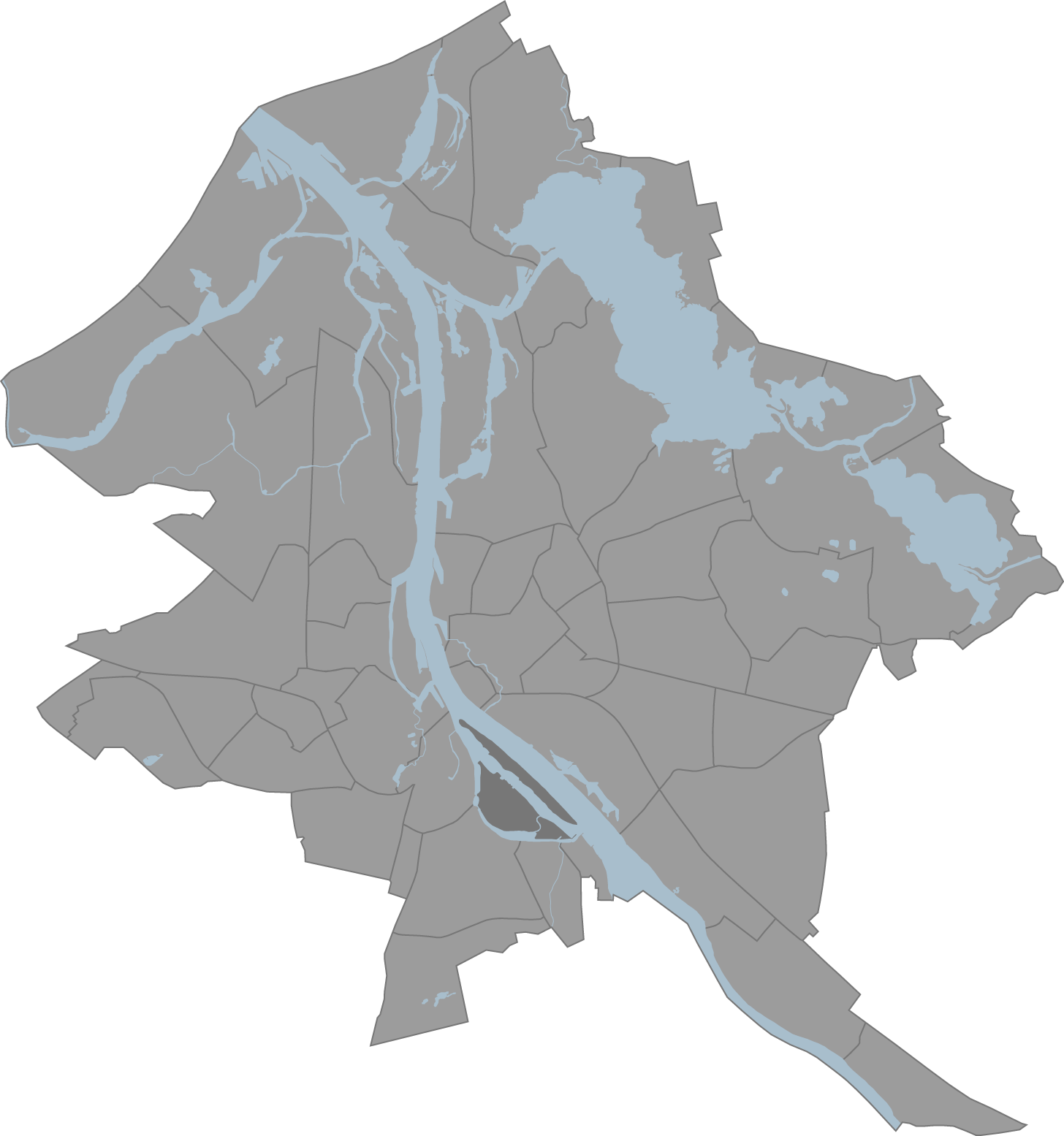
- Location of Salas in Riga
- Country: Latvia
- City: Riga
- Districts: Zemgale Suburb; Latgale Suburb

Area
  - Total: 3.628 km^{2} (1.401 sq mi)

Population (2024)
  - Total: 58
  - Density: 16/km^{2} (41/sq mi)
- Postal codes: LV-1004, LV-1050
- Website: apkaimes.lv

Salas ('Islands' in Latvian) is a neighbourhood of Riga, the capital of Latvia. Its landmass consists entirely of the islands Zaķusala, Lucavsala, and Kazas sēklis ('Goat Sandbank'). It is the least populated neighbourhood of Riga with a population of just around 70-80 people.

== Gallery ==
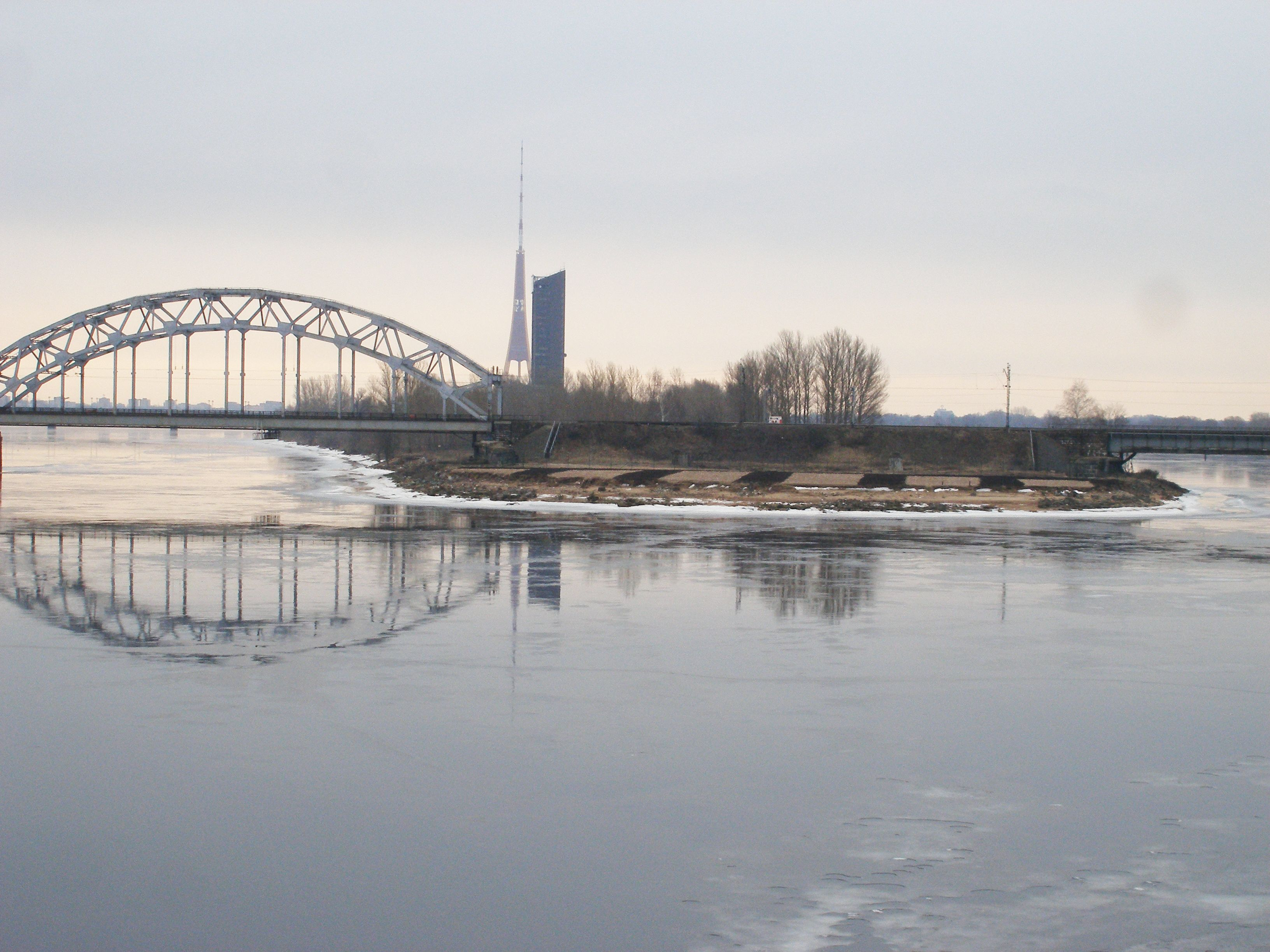
Zaķusala, viewed from the northern end

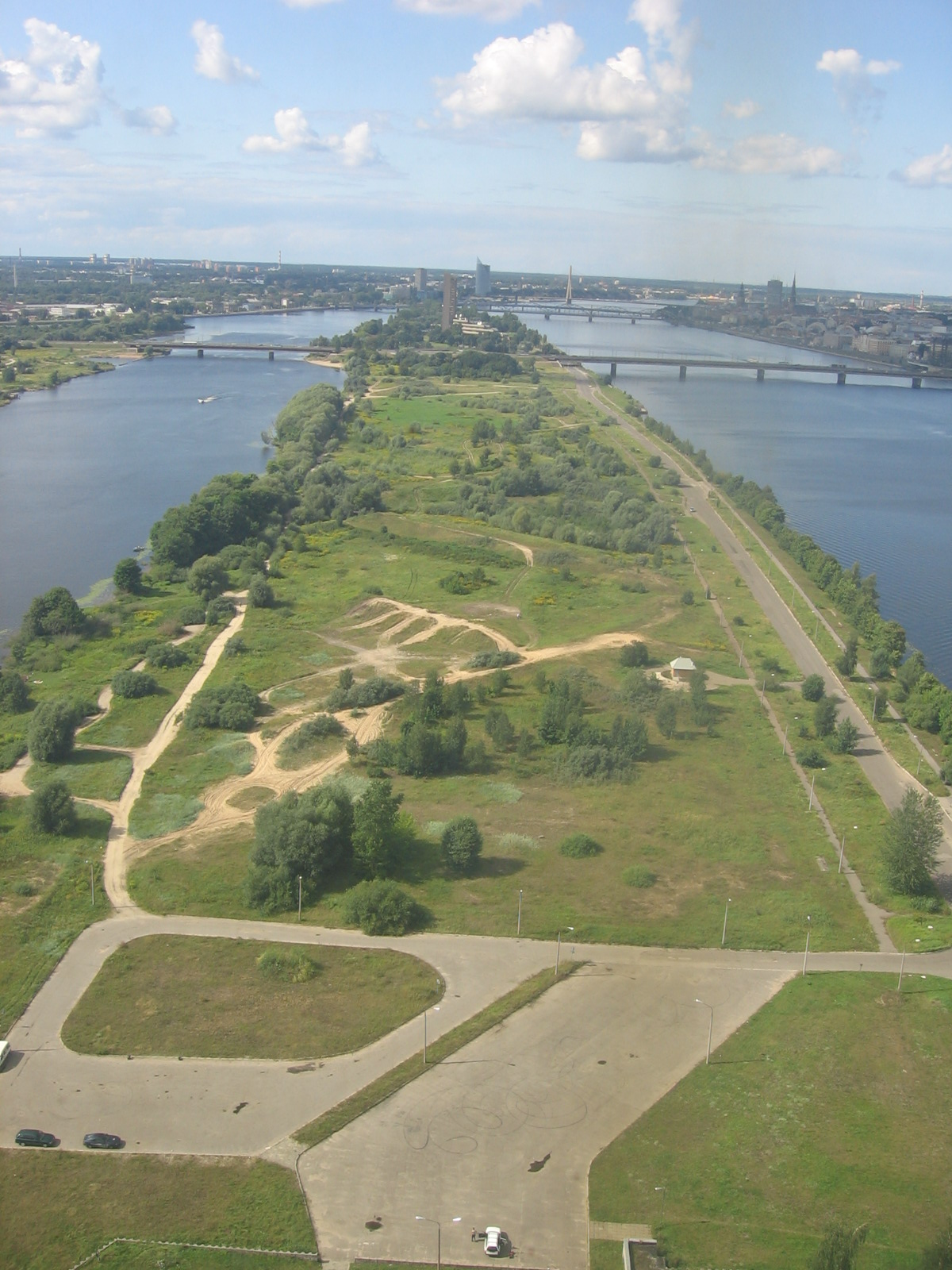
Zaķusala, viewed from the Riga Radio and TV Tower

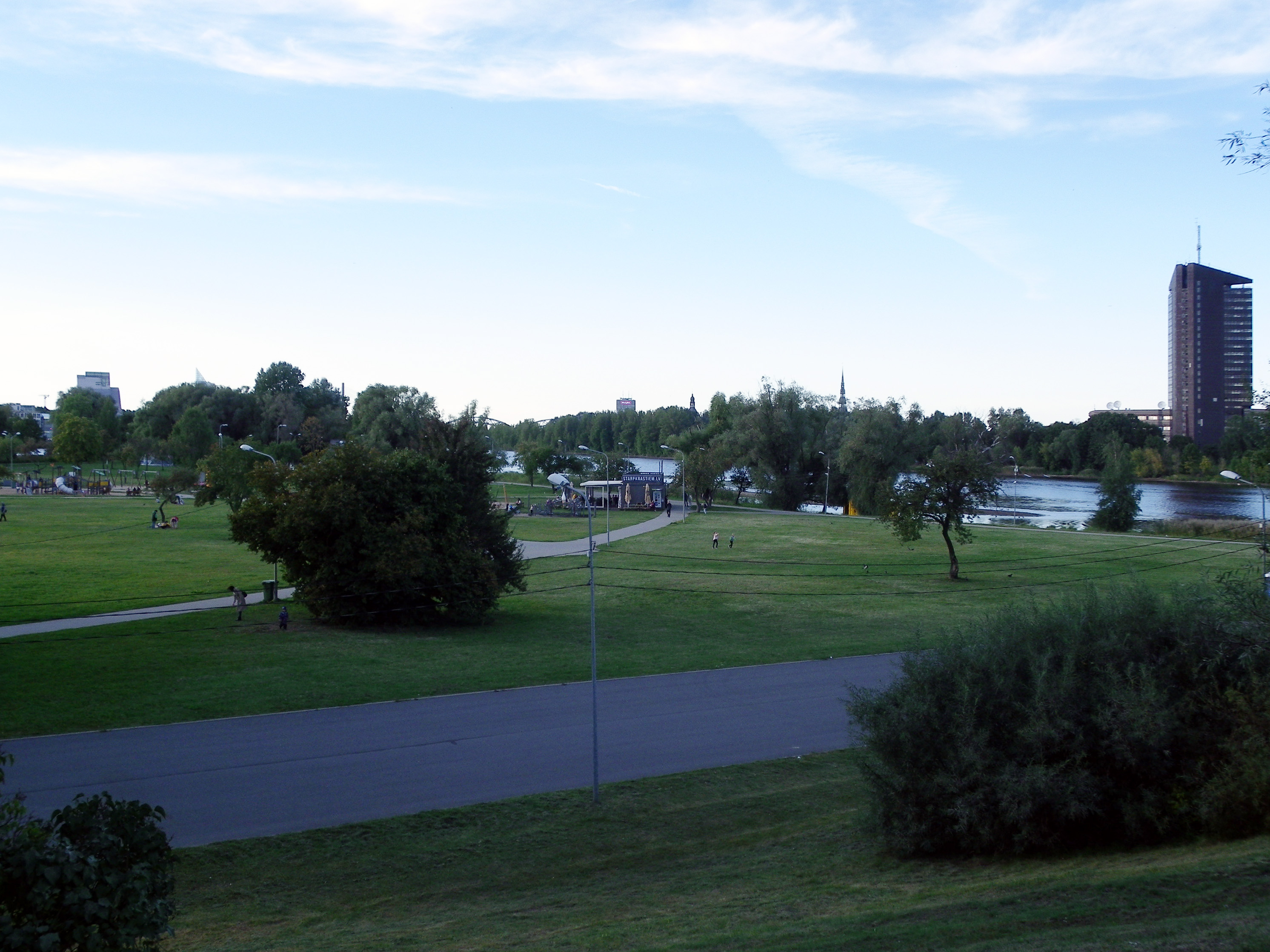
Lucavsala Recreation Park

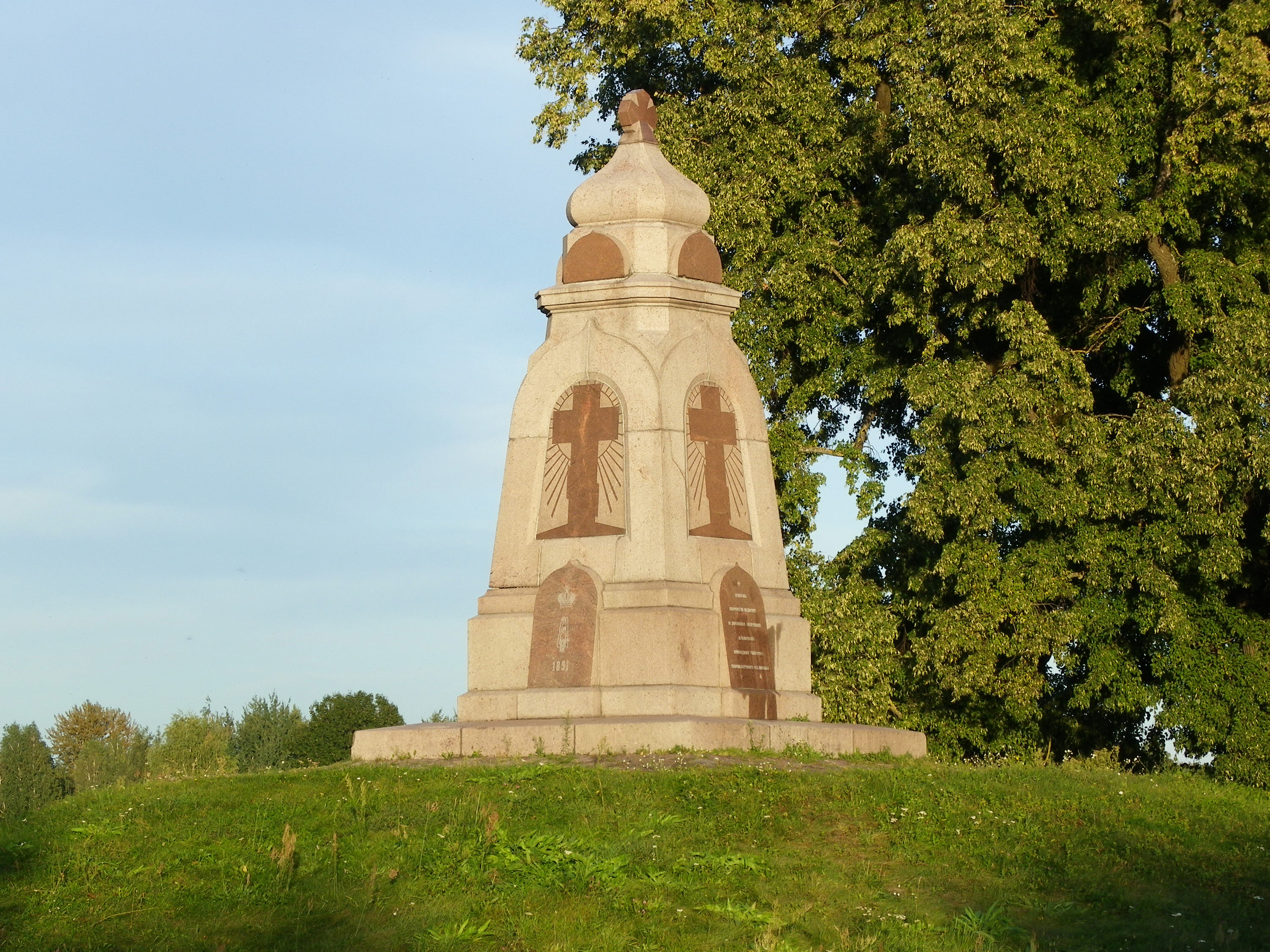
Monument to Russian soldiers from the Great Northern War in Lucavsala

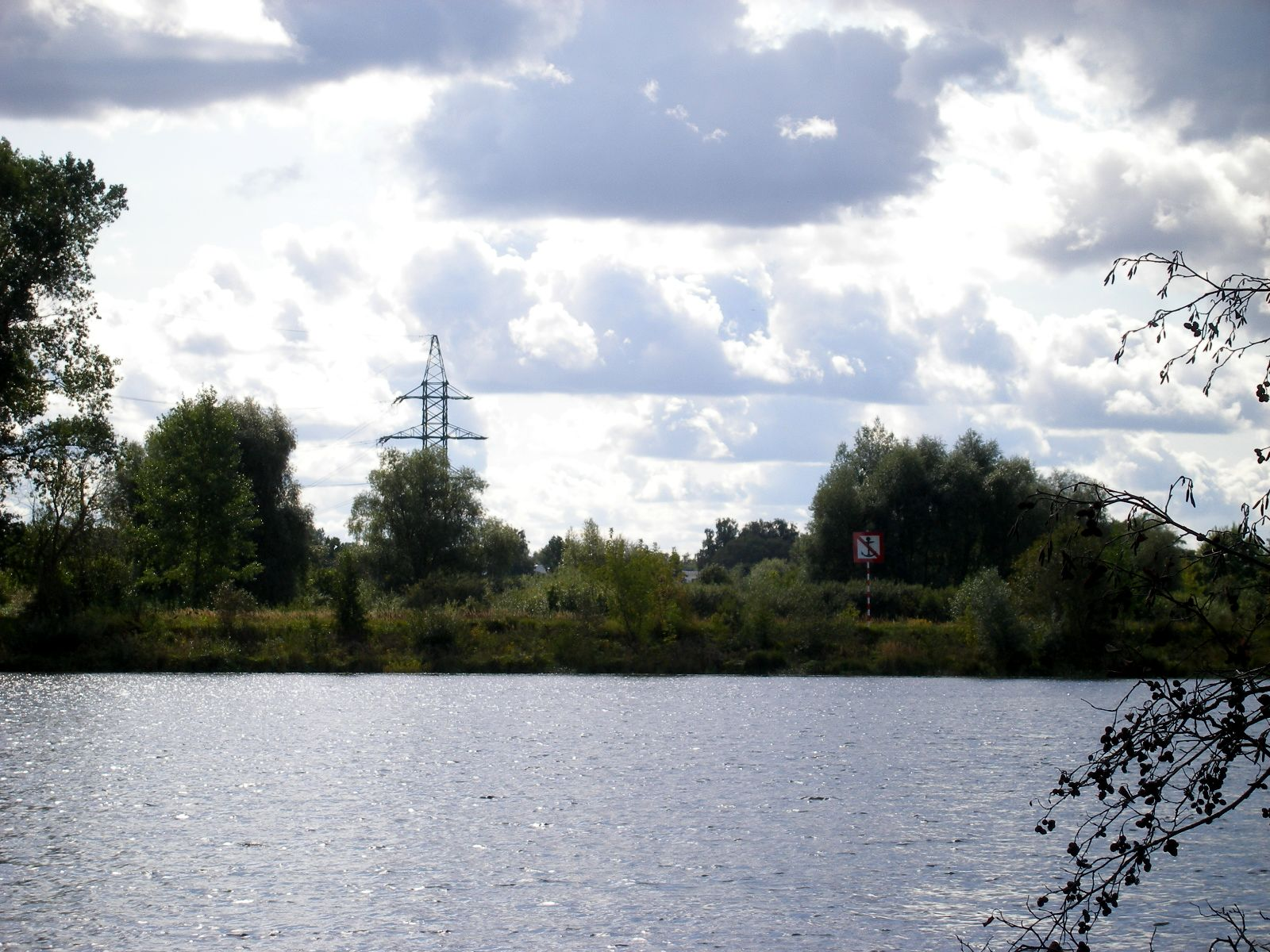
View of Kazas sēklis
