= Iron Bridge =

Iron Bridge may refer to:

== Bridges ==
- The Iron Bridge, Shropshire, England; the first major bridge in the world to be made of cast iron
- The Iron Bridge, Rothiemurchus, Scotland, also known as the Cairngorm Club Footbridge
- The Iron Bridge, Culford Park, in Suffolk, England
- Iron Bridge, Riga, in Latvia
- Iron Bridge, Satu Mare, in Romania
- Aldford Iron Bridge in Aldford, Cheshire, England
- Nandu River Iron Bridge in Hainan, China
- Ponte dell'Industria in Rome, Italy, also known as Ponte di ferro (English: iron bridge)
- Traffic Bridge (Saskatoon) in Saskatchewan, Canada

== Places ==
- Ironbridge, town in Shropshire, England
- Ironbridge Gorge, the gorge formed by the River Severn in Shropshire, England
- Iron Bridge, Ontario, Canada, a community in Huron Shores

== Other uses ==
- Iron Bridge, original codename for the planning of the funeral of Margaret Thatcher
- Battle of the Iron Bridge, fought in 637 near Antioch, Turkey
