= Zaķusala =

Island in Riga, Latvia

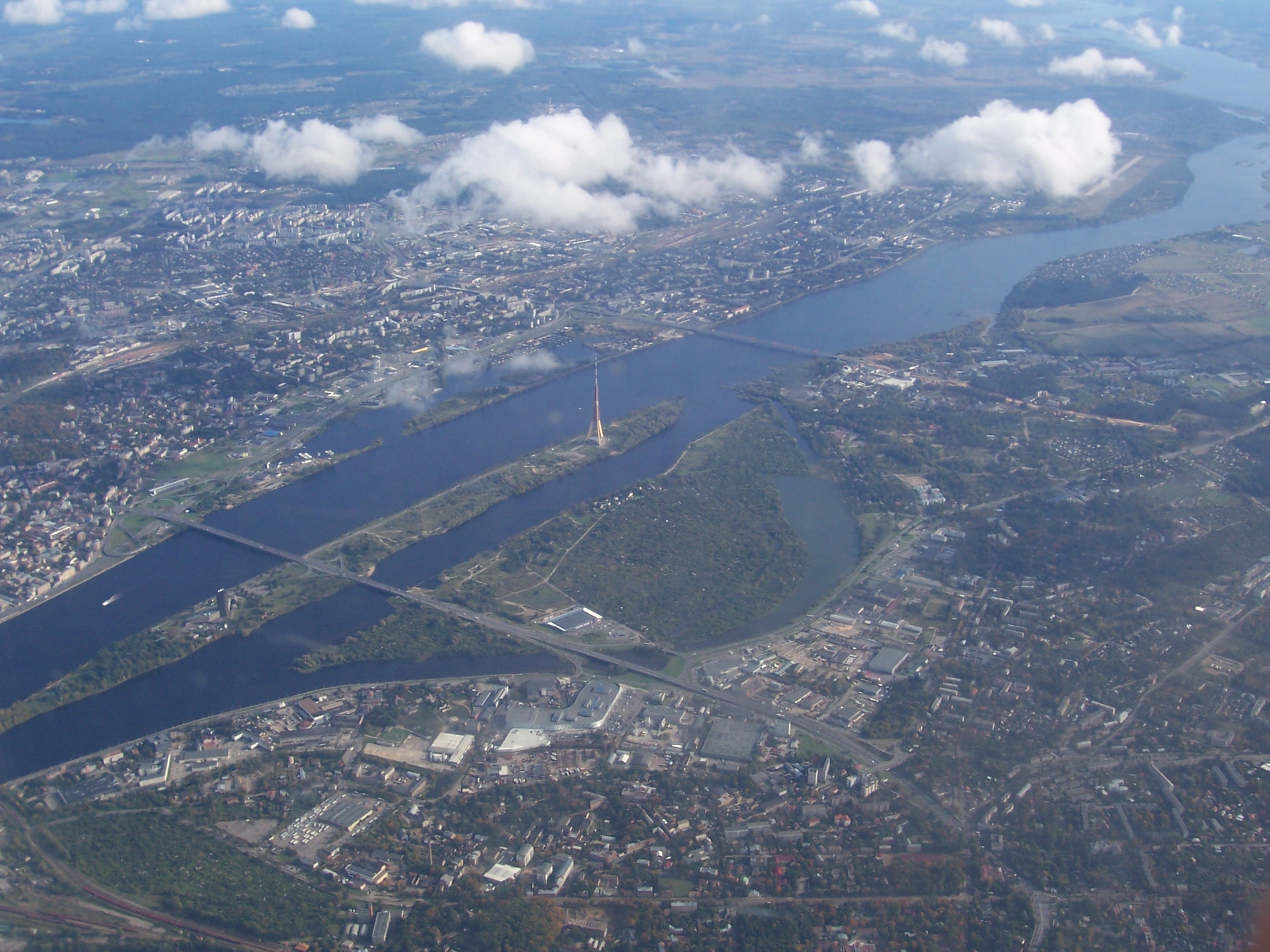
- Zaķusala from the air
- Interactive map of Zaķusala

Geography
- Location: Salas, Latgale Suburb, Riga, Latvia
- Coordinates: 56°55′53″N 24°07′20″E

Administration
- Latvia

Zaķusala (Hare Island) is one of several islands in the Daugava River in the central part of Riga, the capital of Latvia. A part of the city's Salas neighbourhood and of the Latgale Suburb, Zaķusala is home to the Riga Radio and TV Tower, which was completed in 1986 and the Latvian Television building, also completed the same year. The tower is the tallest structure in the Baltic states.

On the northern tip of the island, alongside the railway trestles are remnants of the Iron Bridge that was blown up during the Second World War. The island is connected to the city via the Island Bridge. While the Railway Bridge also crosses the island, it is forbidden to access the island by using it.

In maps of the city of Riga in the start of the 20th century, the island is usually referred by the name "Hasenholm". This name is also used in the story of Amfian Gerasimov (Amfians Gerasimovs), a Righteous Among the Nations that saved a Jewish family that live on this island. The island had a noticeable population until the beginning of the construction of the radio and TV centers, upon which the inhabitants were resettled to other areas of Riga.

== Gallery ==
Latvian Television building

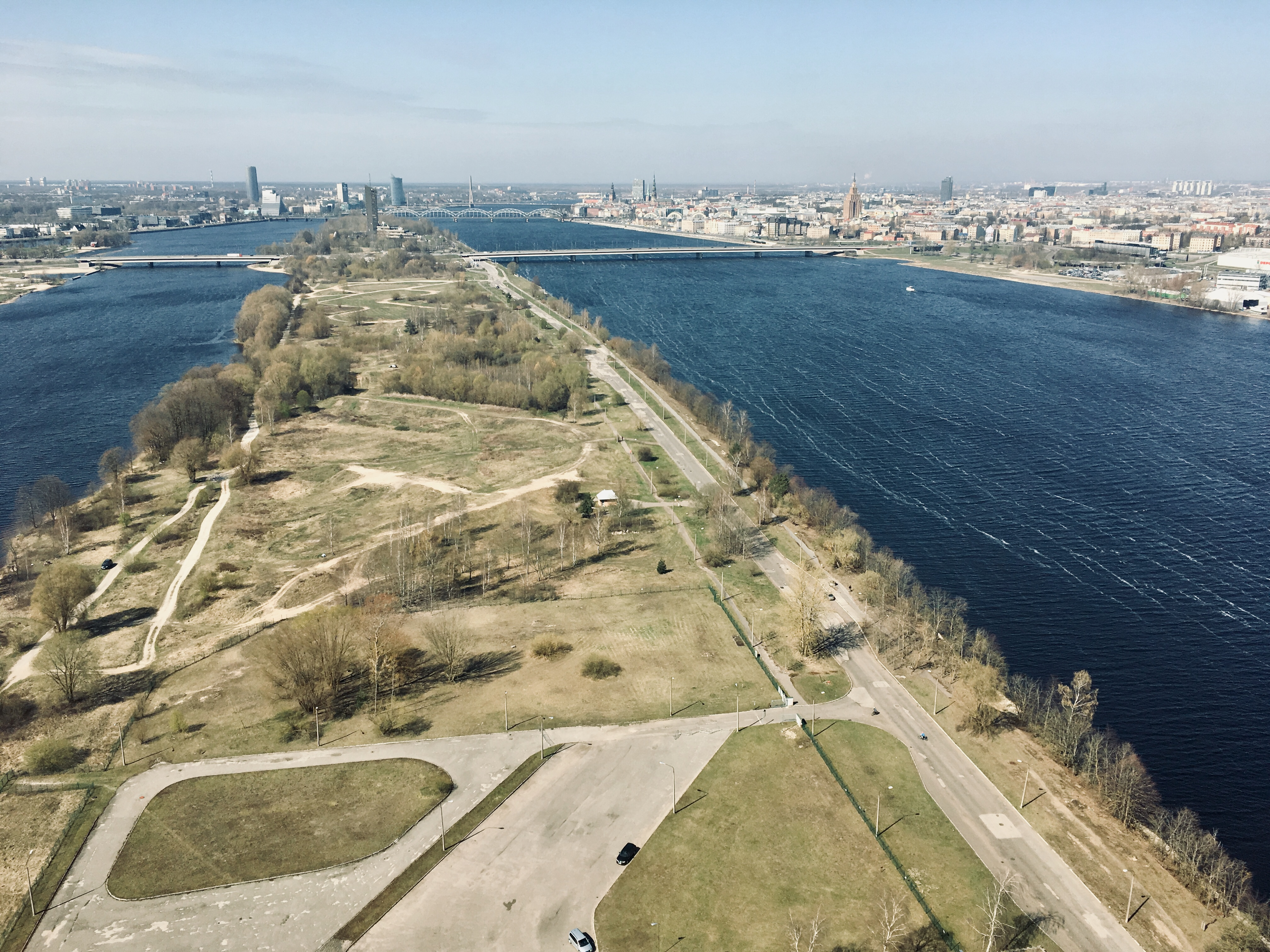
View of the island from the TV Tower

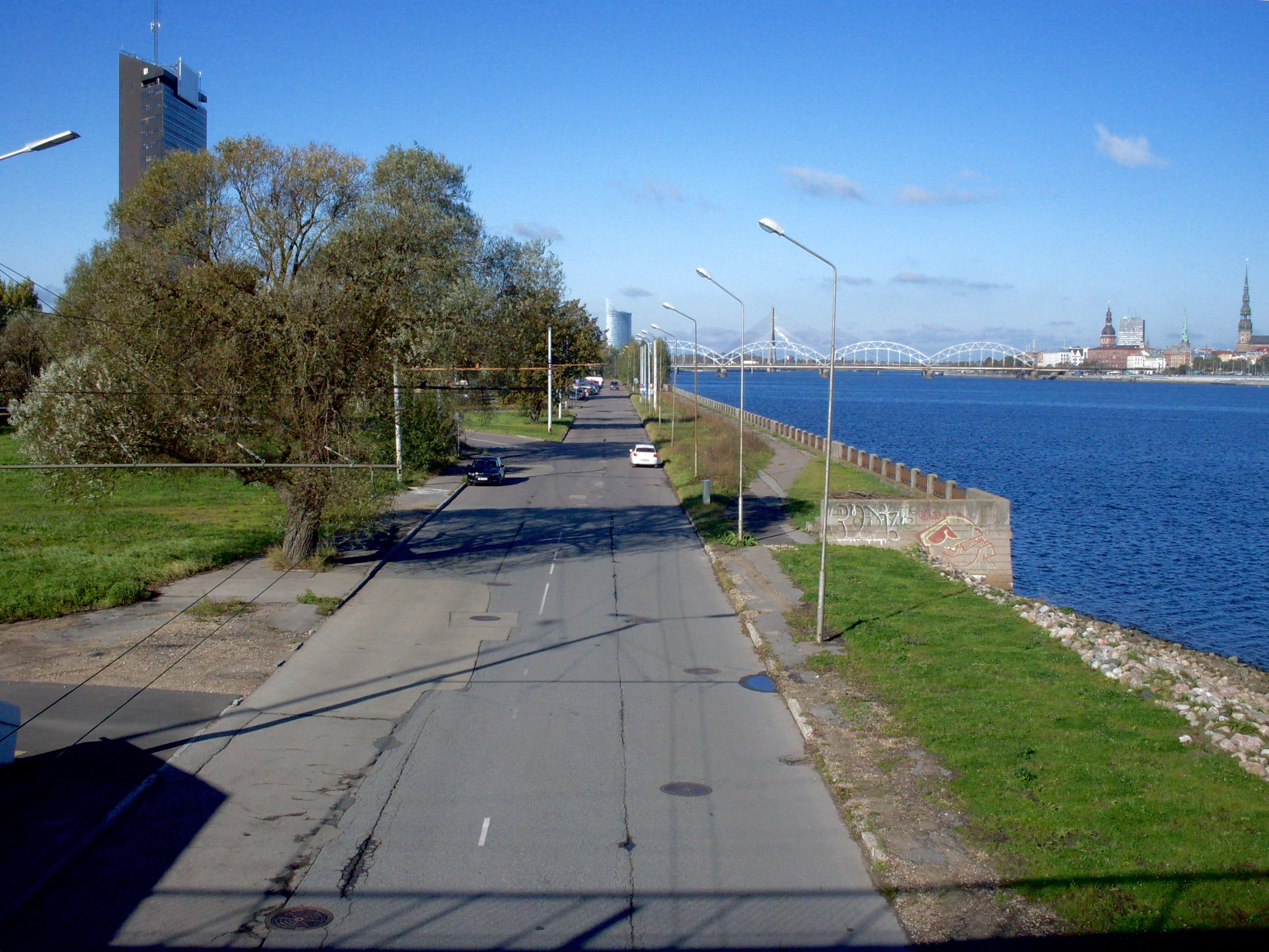
Along Zaķusalas krastmala (Zaķusala Embankment)

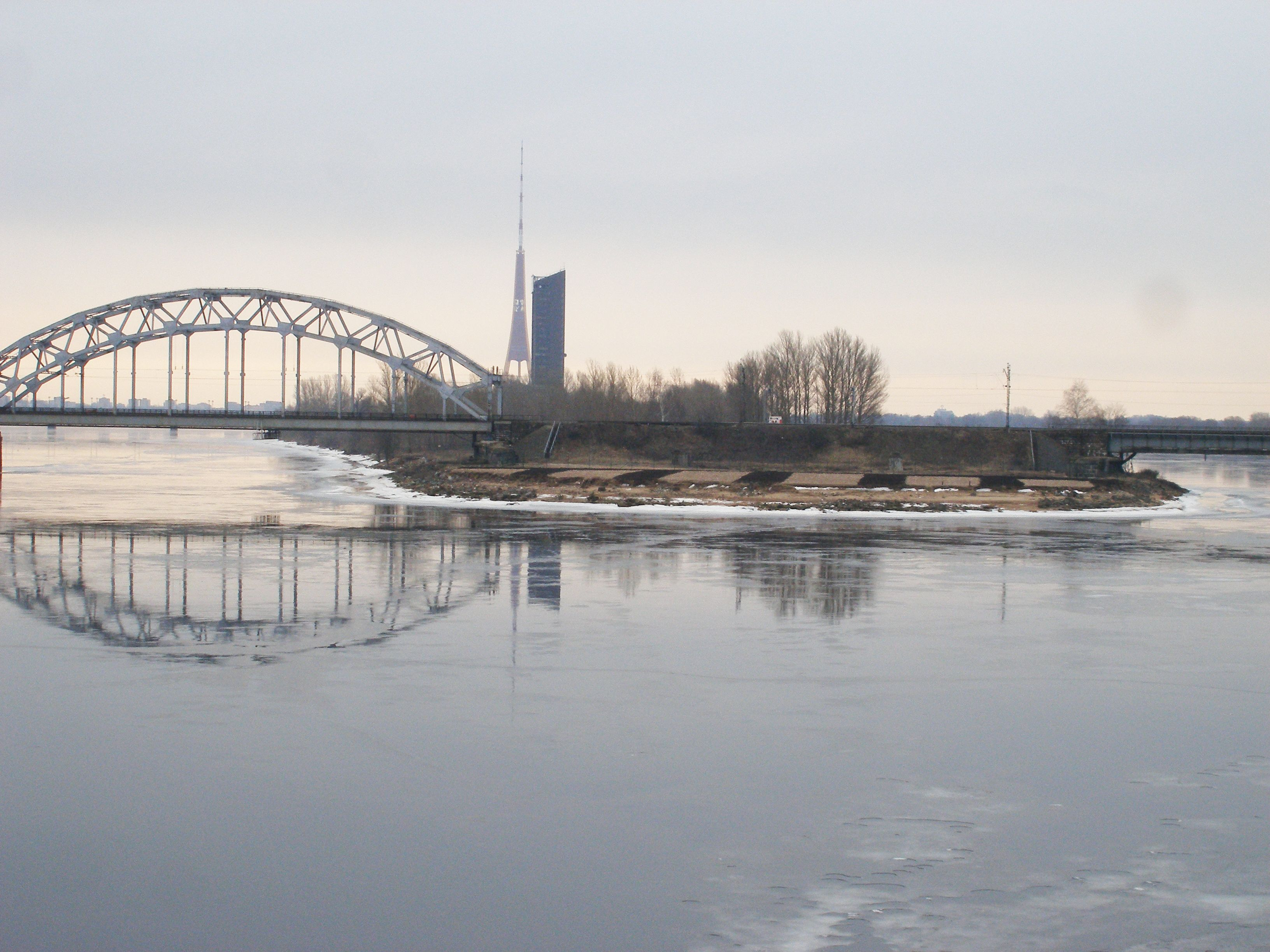
Northern tip of the island with artificial Sterna nesting spot

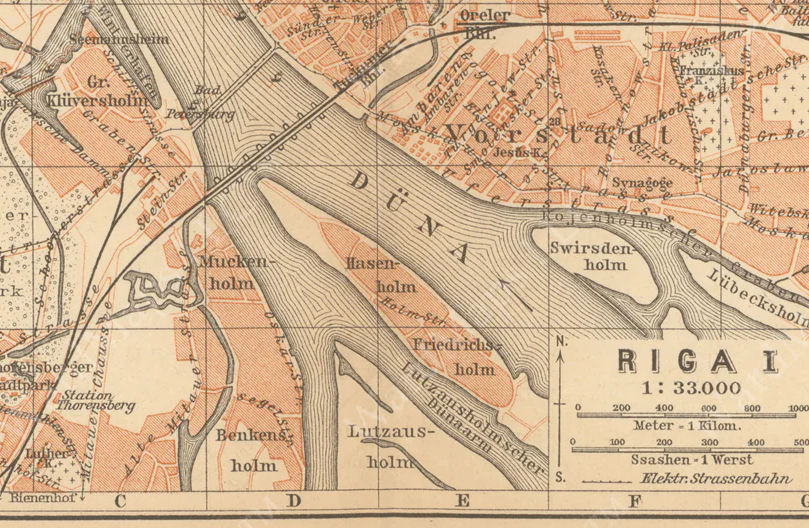
A zoom in on the island of Zaķusala (then Hasenholm) from a Map of Lita, Latvia, 1914.

TV tower seen on Zaķusala
