= Railway Bridge, Riga =

Bridge in Riga, Latvia

Railway Bridge Dzelzceļa tilts
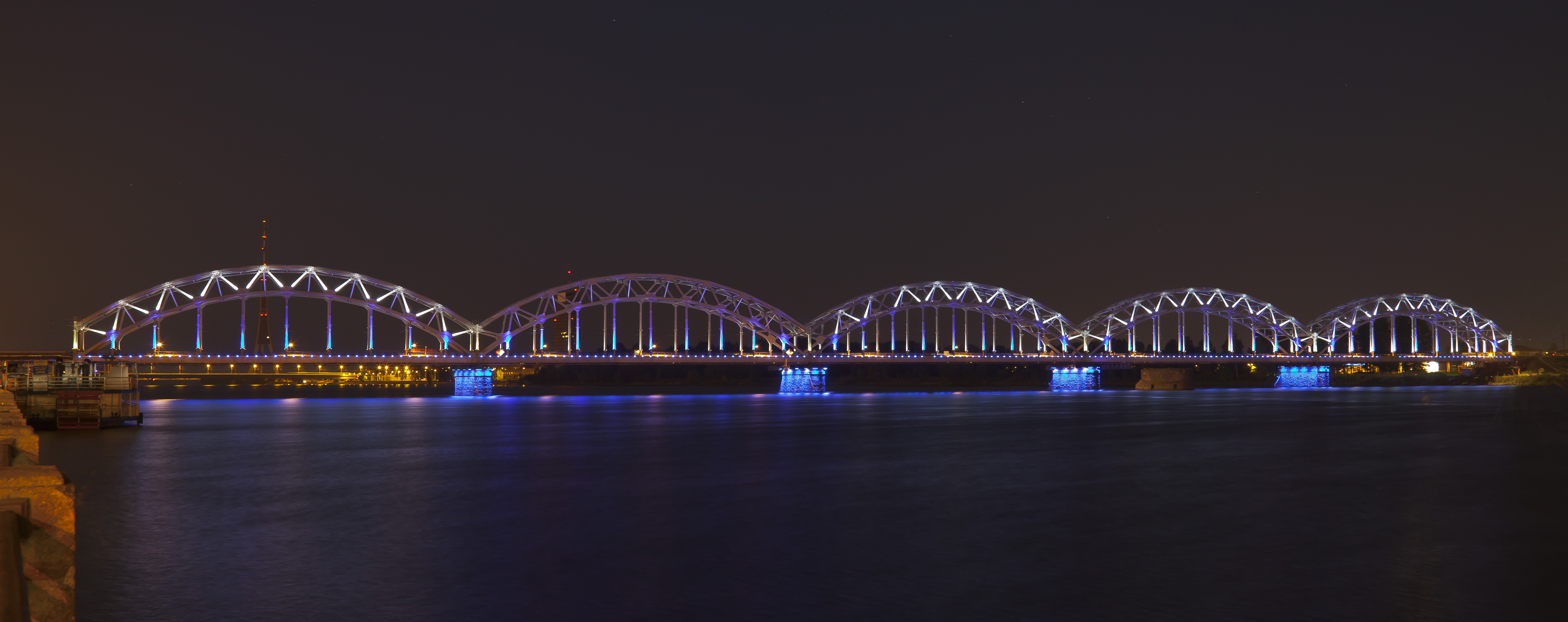
- Coordinates: 56.9422588°N 24.1067505°E
- Crosses: Daugava
- Locale: Riga, Latvia

Characteristics
- Material: Steel

History
- Construction start: 1909
- Inaugurated: 1914 (rebuilt in 1918 and 1955)

The Railway Bridge (Latvian: Dzelzceļa tilts) is a bridge that crosses the Daugava river in Riga, the capital of Latvia.

The first iron railway bridge in Riga, over 600 ftm long, was erected in 1871–1872 for the Riga–Jelgava Railway.

The new bridge was inaugurated 1914, shelled twice, during World War I in 1917 and World War II in 1944, and was rebuilt both times. The bridge is nowadays the only railway bridge in Riga.

The bridge will be duplicated as part of the new Rail Baltica line through Riga.

== Gallery ==
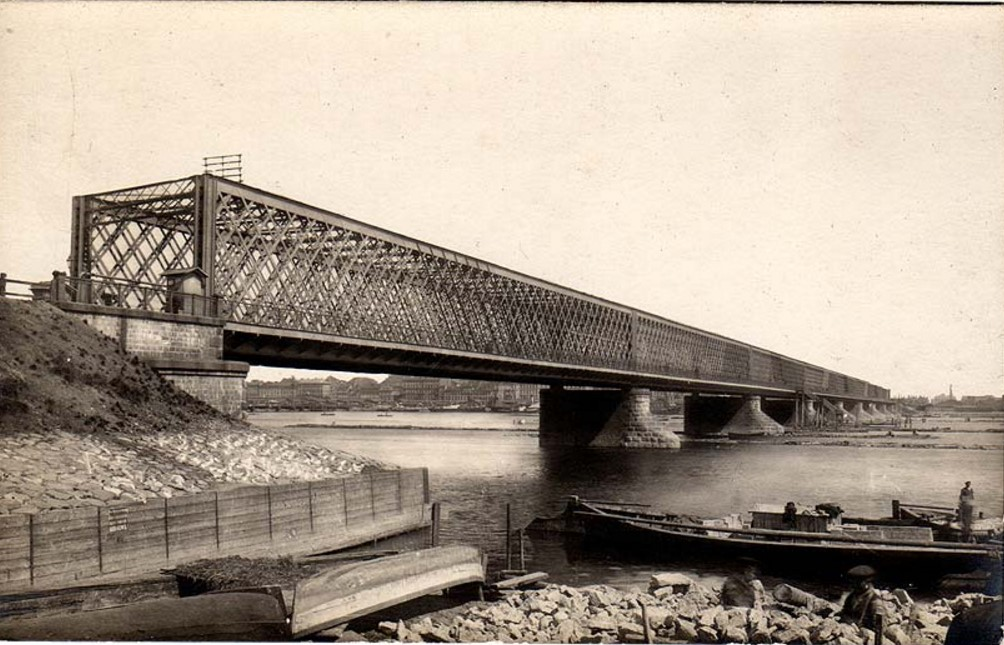
Iron Bridge, erected 1871-1872

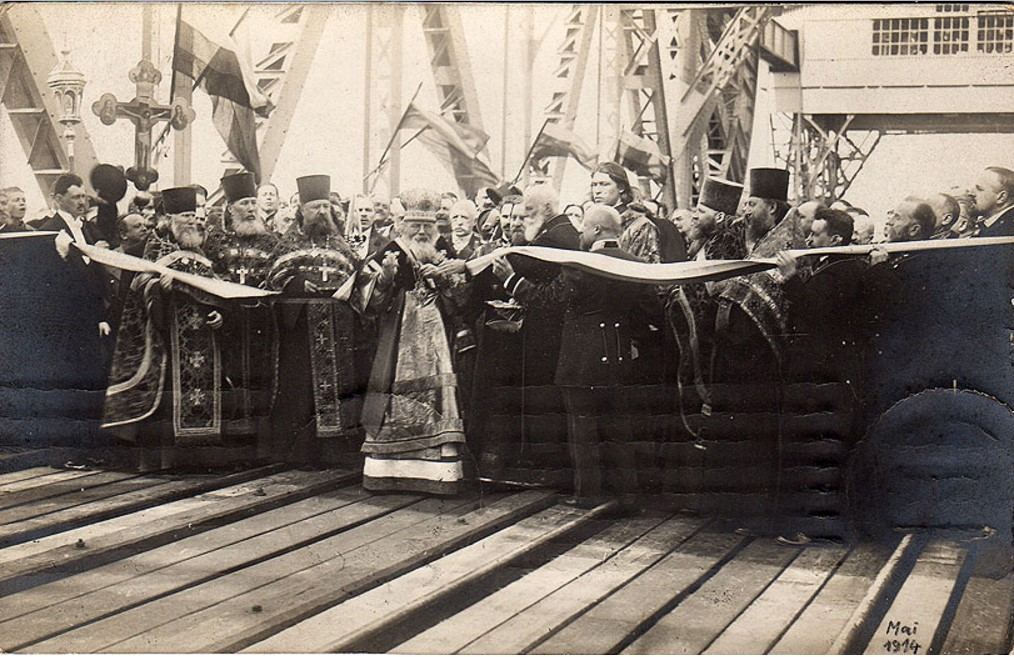
Inauguration of first bridge in 1914

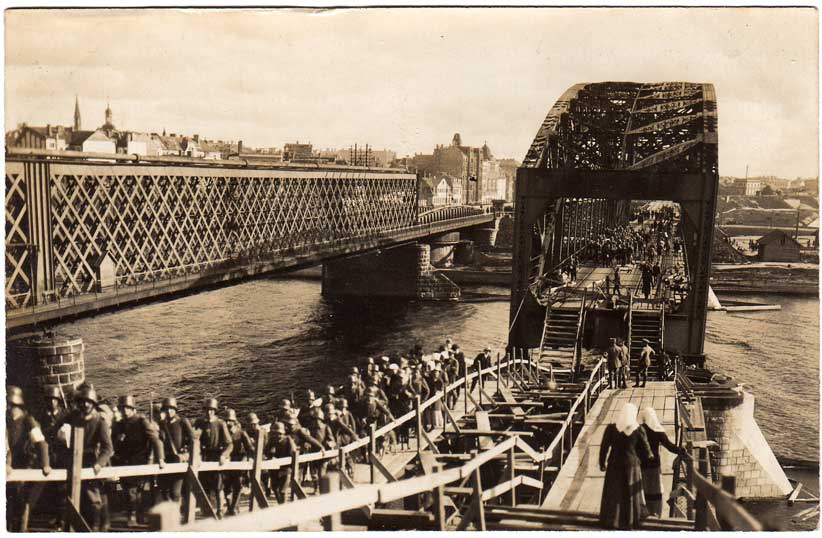
German troops crossing the shelled bridge 1917

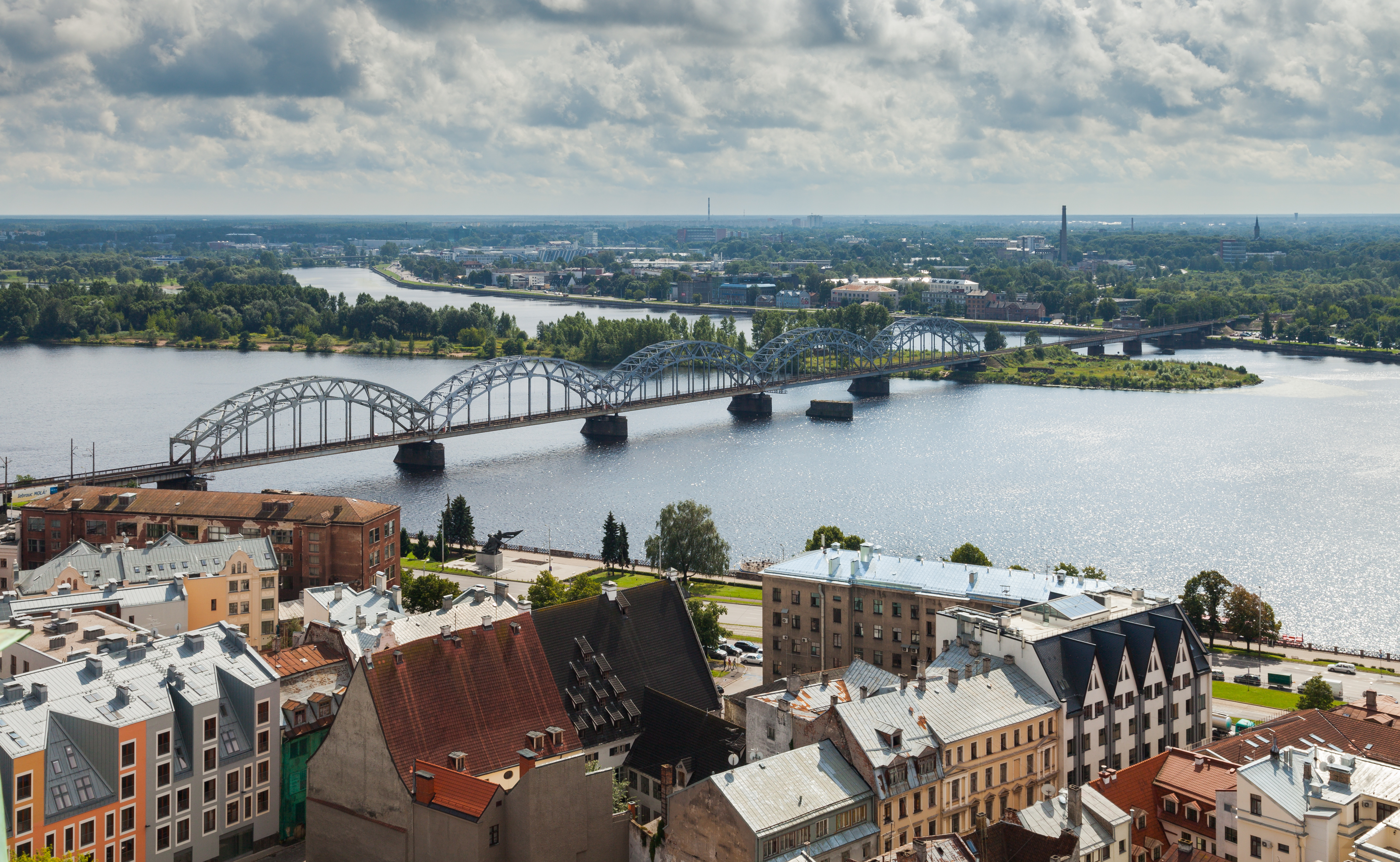
Bridge today, pylons from former Iron Bridge still visible
