= Island Bridge, Riga =

Bridge in Riga, Latvia

Island Bridge Salu tilts
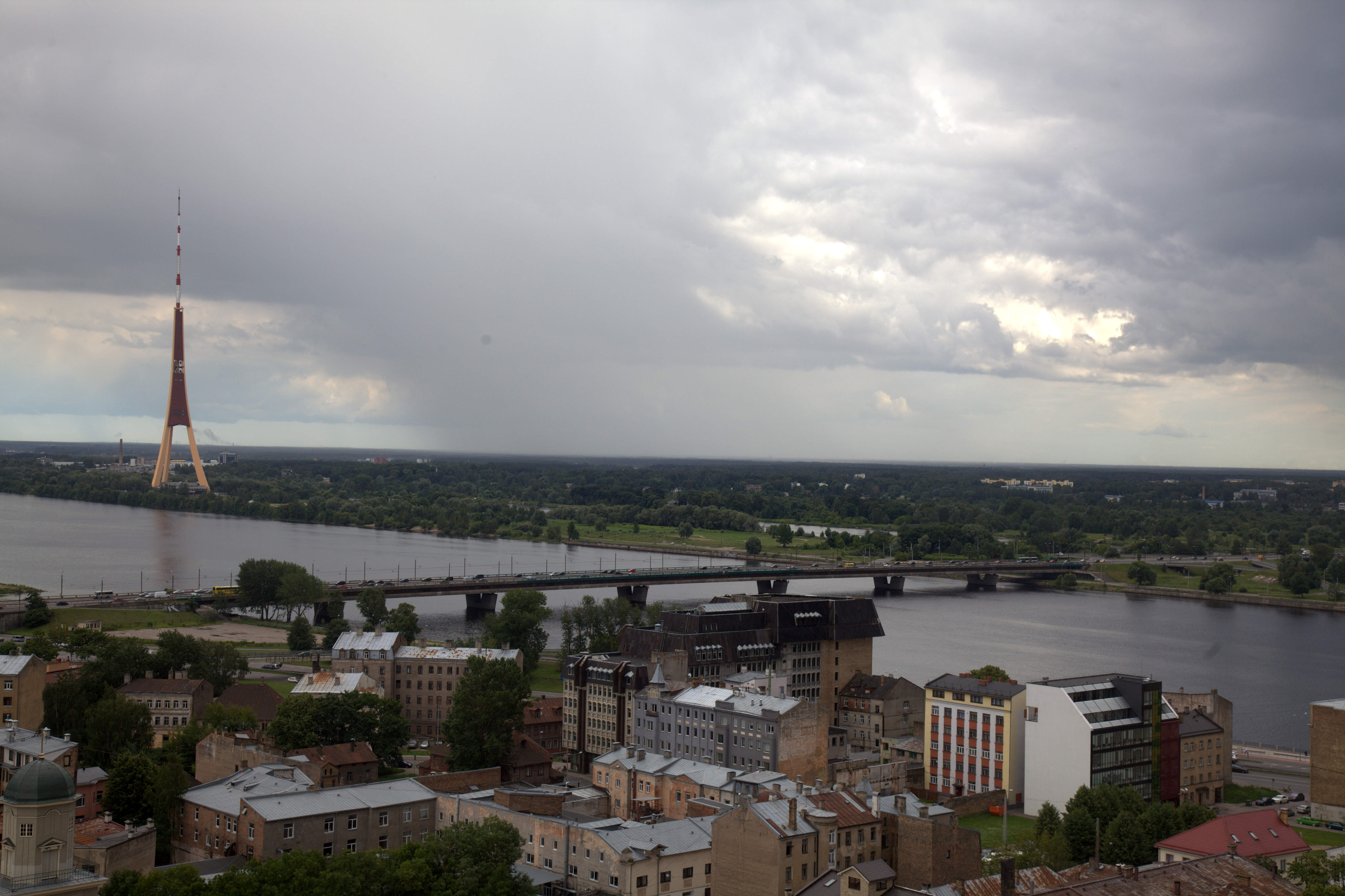
- Coordinates: 56.934444°N 24.123056°E
- Crosses: Daugava
- Locale: Riga, Latvia
- Other name(s): Moscow bridge

Characteristics
- Material: Steel, concrete
- Total length: 3500 meters
- Width: 24 meters
- Longest span: 1795 meters
- No. of spans: 2

History
- Inaugurated: 1976

The Island Bridge (Latvian: Salu tilts) is a bridge that crosses the Daugava river in Riga, the capital of Latvia. The bridge was built in the period from 1975 to 1977. It was called the Moscow Bridge (Maskavas tilts) until 1991. The bridge provides access to Zaķusala (Hare Island) and Lucavsala.

On June 26, 2018, second phase of the bridge's reconstruction costing 19.6 million euros was initiated.

== Gallery ==
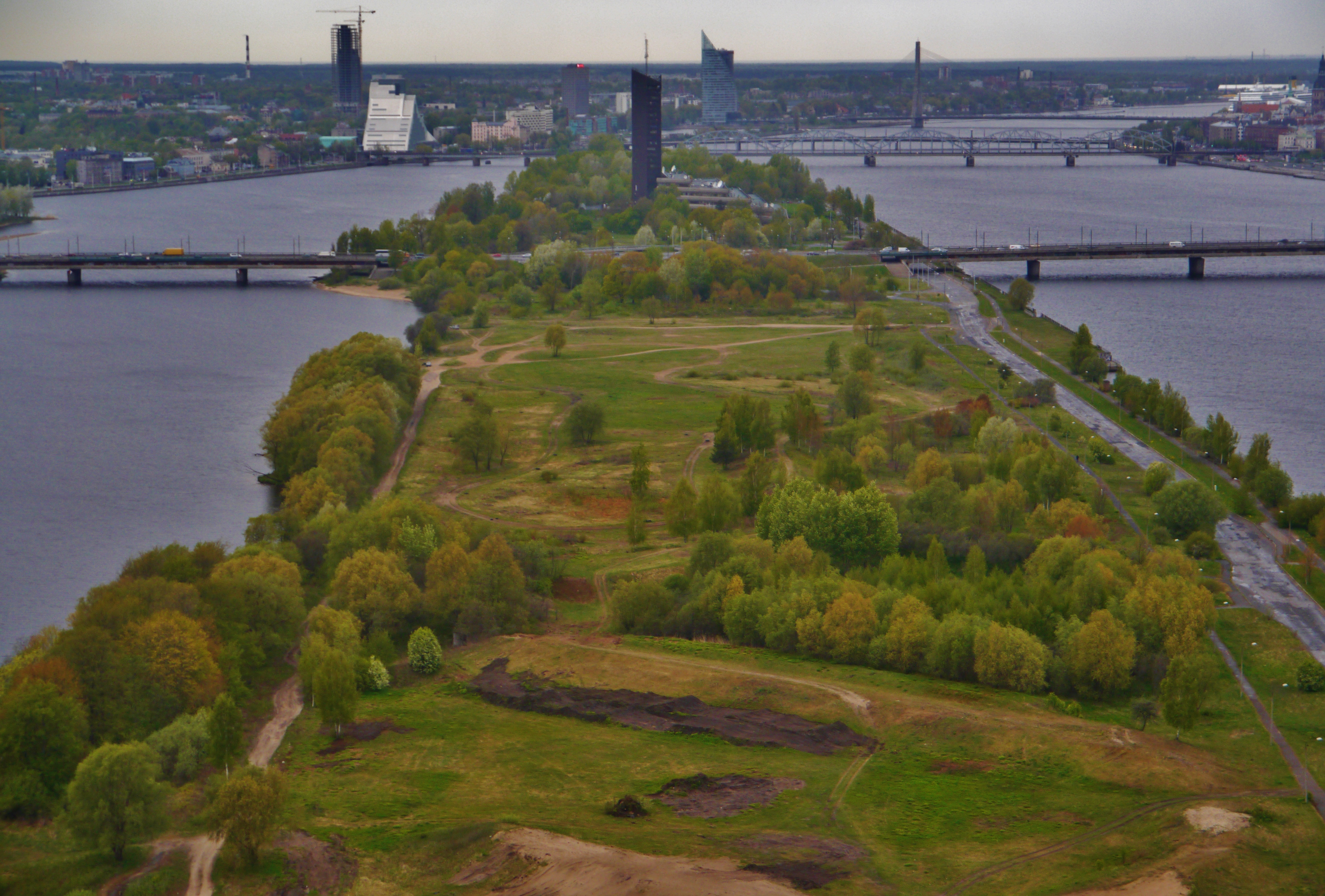
Bridge over Hare Island

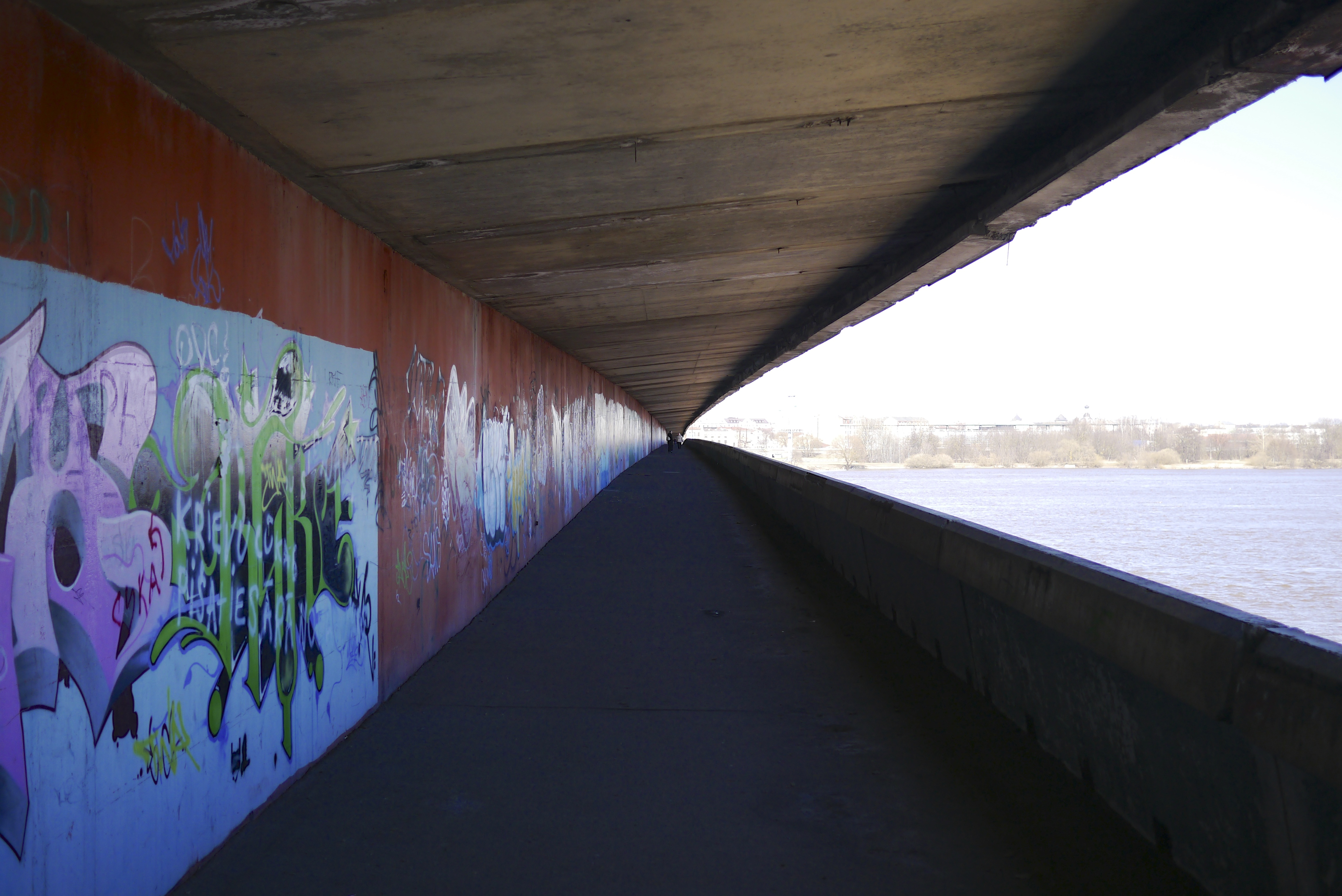
Dual-deck footpath
