= Iron Bridge, Satu Mare =

Iron Bridge
- Coordinates: 47°47′08″N 22°53′00″E
- Carries: 1 rail line (Căile Ferate Române); 2 pedestrian walkways
- Crosses: Someş River
- Locale: Satu Mare
- Official name: Podul de Fier
- Maintained by: Căile Ferate Române

Characteristics
- Design: Truss bridge
- Total length: 227 m (745 ft)
- Width: 11 m (36 ft)
- Longest span: 50 m (160 ft)
- Clearance above: 15 m (49 ft)

History
- Opened: 1975

The Iron Bridge (Romanian: Podul de Fier) crosses the lower Someş River to the east side of Satu Mare city, linking the residential districts of Gelu and Centru Nou.

The Iron Bridge is a riveted over-deck truss bridge with steel girders and is 227 m (745 ft) long, 11 m (36 ft) wide, and 30 m (98 ft) high.
