= Riga Radio and TV Tower =

Television tower in Riga, Latvia

- Rīgas radio un televīzijas tornis
- The Riga Radio and TV Tower viewed in 2012
- Interactive map of the Riga Radio and TV Tower area

Record height
- Tallest in European Union since 2004^{[I]}
- Preceded by: Fernsehturm Berlin

General information
- Type: Mixed-use
- Location: Riga, Latvia
- Coordinates: 56.9240°N 24.1370°E
- Construction started: 1979
- Completed: 1989

Height
- Antenna spire: 368.5 m (1,209 ft)
- Roof: 222 m (728 ft)

Technical details
- Lifts/elevators: 4

Design and construction
- Architects: Kims Nikuradze; Nikolajs Sergijevskis; Viktors Savčenko

Riga TV tower from boat level

The Riga Radio and TV Tower (Latvian: Rīgas radio un televīzijas tornis) in Riga, Latvia is the tallest tower in the European Union. It is operated by the Latvian State Radio and Television Centre (LVRTC). It was built between 1979 and 1989 with funding from the central government of the Soviet Union. Its highest point reaches 368.5 metres (1,209 ft),^{†} which makes it the third tallest tower in Europe (after the Ostankino Tower at 540 metres (1,770 ft) and the Kyiv TV Tower at 385 metres (1,263 ft)) and the 15th tallest self-supporting tower in the world.

== Features ==
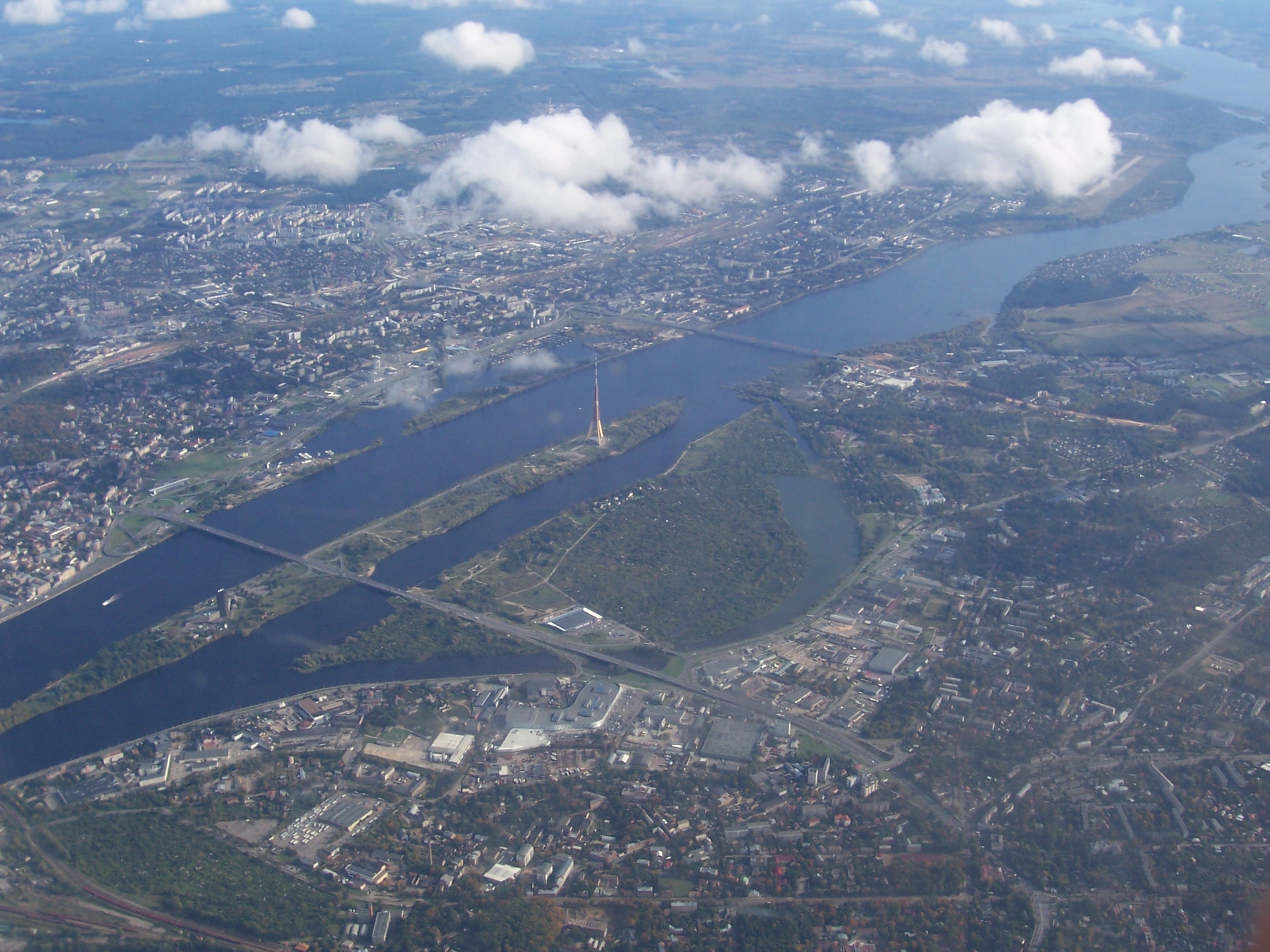
Aerial view of Zaķusala and the Daugava

There was a restaurant, "Vēja roze" ("Wind Rose"), at the 93-metre (305 ft) level, which was open since the completion of the tower until 2006. Before the tower was closed to visitors in 2019, there was a public observation platform just above it at 97 metres (318 ft), from which most of the city and surroundings and the Gulf of Riga could be seen.

=== Renovation ===
The tower has been closed to visitors since 2019 as part of the TV Tower 2.0 renovation project. In April 2026, the renovation was scheduled to be completed by the end of 2029, with the tower's operations expected to continue during the work. The revised project includes restoration of the first three floors and public areas, while the upper sections and technical area are to remain untouched; the previously planned Foucault pendulum is not currently included.

== Construction ==
The design chosen for the tower was that of Georgian architect Kims Nikuradze. Also credited are Nikolajs Sergijevskis and Viktors Savčenko. Construction materials included dolomite from Saaremaa, Karelian granite, and ironwork that had been prefabricated in Chelyabinsk. The assembly was done by the St Petersburg North-western Ironwork Assembly Trust.

The tower is built on an island called Zaķusala (English: Hare Island) in the middle of the River Daugava, and the base of the tower is located about 7 metres (23 ft) above mean sea level. The tower is built to resist winds up to 44 metres per second (98 mph) without any noticeable vibration with the help of three 9.1-metric-ton (10-short-ton) dampers installed at the 198-metre (650 ft) level. Though seismic activity is rare, the tower was designed to withstand a magnitude 7.5 earthquake. The projected service life of the tower is 250 years.

=== Bottom section ===
The support section of the tower rises the first 88 metres (289 ft), comprising the three pillars that give the tower its unusual appearance, and a central building that contains offices and machine rooms. There are two high-speed sloping elevators, one in the north-east pillar and one in the south-west pillar, that ascend the bottom section in just 42 seconds. The third pillar contains a staircase. It is one of only three "tall" towers in the world that has 3 pillars; the others are the Avala Tower in Belgrade and Žižkov Television Tower in Prague.

=== Middle section ===
The middle section, at 88–222 metres (289–728 ft), contains equipment and a central elevator and is enclosed by panels of COR-TEN, an aluminum-iron alloy.

=== Top section ===
The top section, at 222–368 metres (728–1,207 ft), is a cylindrical structure which supports and contains the various antennas, and is topped by a flagpole. An elevator rises to the machine rooms at the 308-metre (1,010 ft) level, and stairs ascend another 44 metres (144 ft).

== Operations ==
The tower started broadcasting regularly in January 1986, though construction work continued until 1989.

The following television channels are broadcast from the tower:

- Latvian Television 1
- Latvian Television 7
- TV3
- RīgaTV 24
- DVB-T signal

The following radio stations broadcast from the tower:

Frequency	Station
89.2	Radio SWH Rock
90.0	Radio SWH Gold
90.7	Latvijas Radio 1
91.5	Latvijas Radio 2
94.5	Retro FM
95.8	Latvijas Radio 6 - Naba
101.8	Latvijas Kristīgais Radio
102.3	Radio Skonto +
102.7	Radio MIX FM
103.7	Latvijas Radio 3 - Klasika
104.3	European Hit Radio
105.2	Radio SWH
105.7	Radio SWH+
106.2	Radio Star FM
106.8	Radio TEV
107.2	Radio Skonto
107.7	Latvijas Radio 4 - Doma laukums

Additionally, broadcast and two-way communications services are provided for various organizations and government agencies.

== See also ==
- List of tallest towers in the world
- List of tallest freestanding structures in the world
- List of tallest freestanding steel structures
- Riga LVRTC Transmitter

== Notes ==
^†Sources vary slightly as to the exact height: The official website shows 368 metres (1,207 ft); Emporis claims the exact equivalent, 1,207.35 feet (368.00 m); Structurae claims 368.5 metres (1,209 ft).
