= Iron Bridge, Riga =

Former bridge in Riga, Latvia

Coordinates: 56.9422°N 24.1064°E

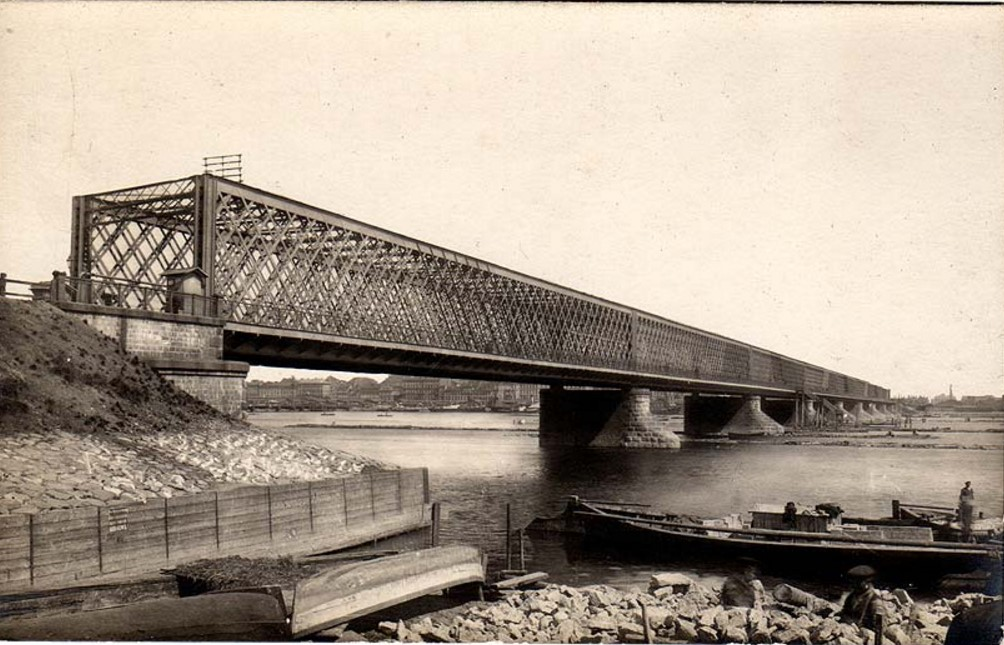
Iron Bridge seen from Pārdaugava as it looked like in the very early 20th century.

The Iron Bridge (Latvian: Dzelzs tilts) or Semigallia Bridge (Zemgales tilts) was a bridge that crossed the Daugava river in Riga, the capital of Latvia. It was built in 1871–72. The bridge was bombarded twice, during World War I and World War II, and was not rebuilt after the latter war. The only remains of the bridge are its pillars in the river.

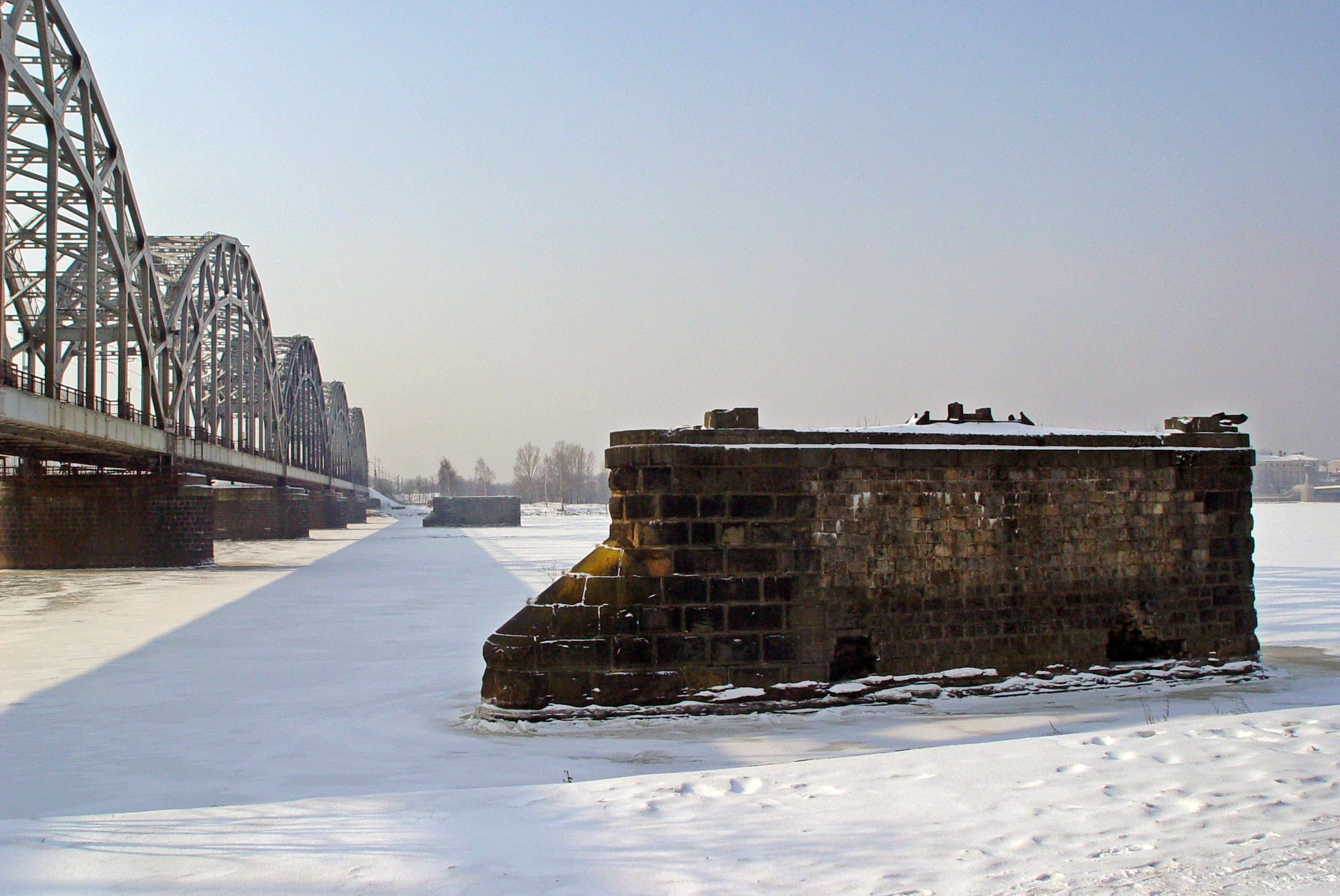
The bridge piers in 2005
