= Ķengarags =

Neighborhood of Riga, Latvia

Coordinates: 56.9092°N 24.1867°E

- Neighborhood of Riga
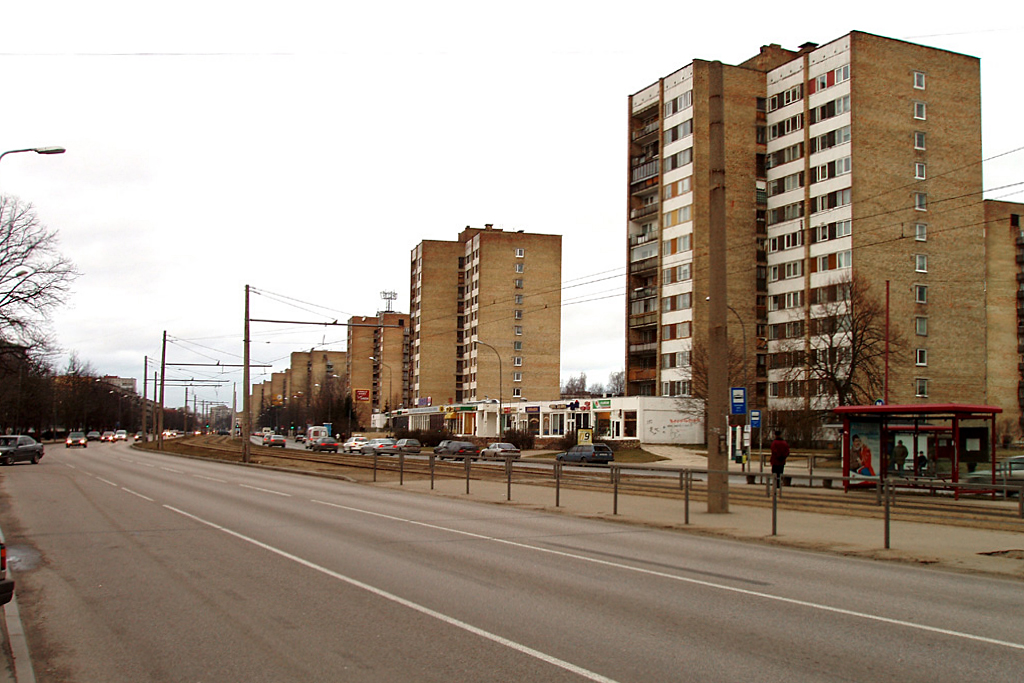
- Latgales Street in Ķengarags

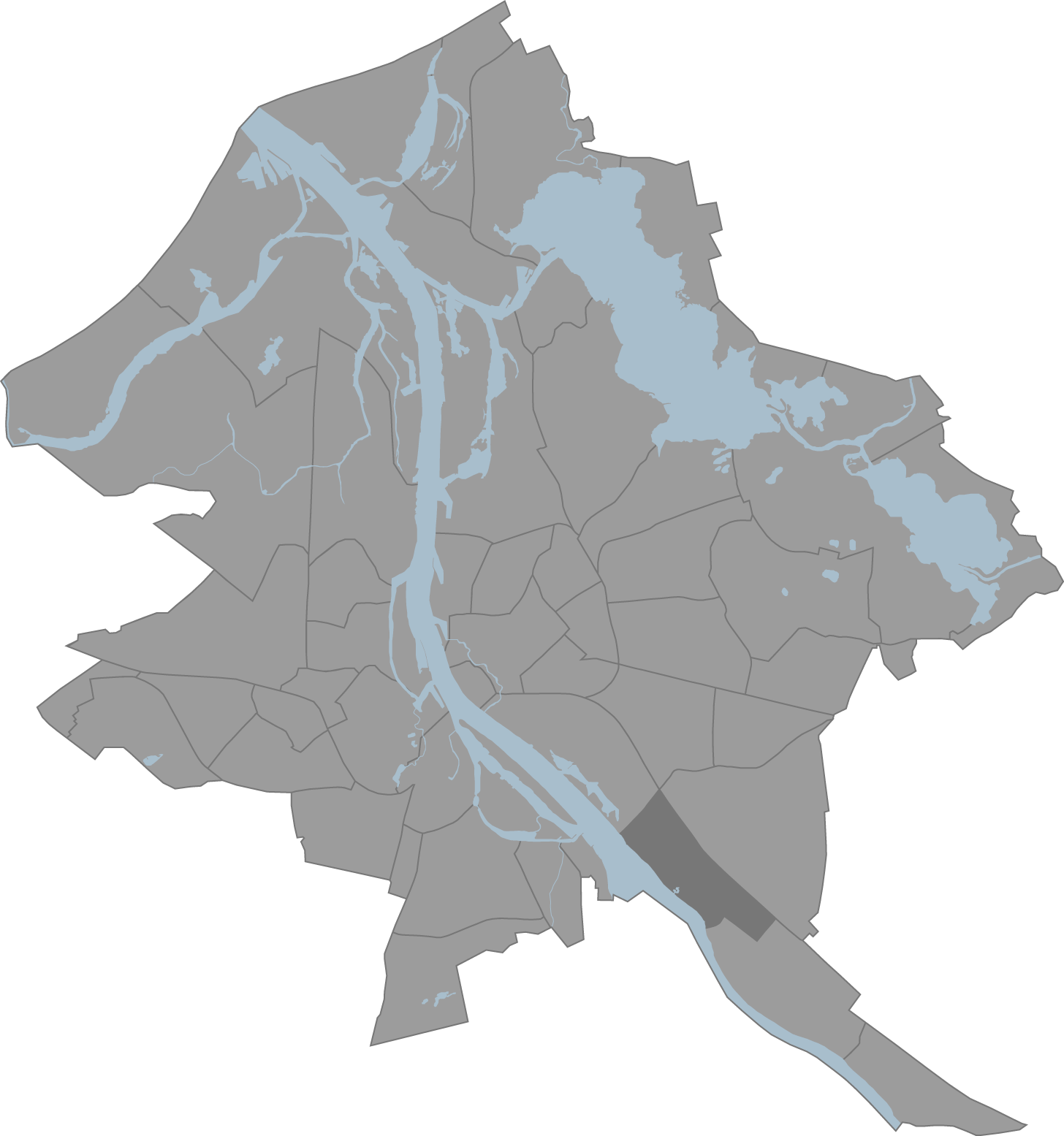
- Location in Riga
- Country: Latvia
- City: Riga
- District: Latgale Suburb
- First mentioned: Late 16th century

Area
  - Total: 5.190 km^{2} (2.004 sq mi)

Population (2024)
  - Total: 43,431
  - Density: 8,368/km^{2} (21,670/sq mi)
- Time zone: UTC+2 (EET)
  - Summer (DST): UTC+3 (EEST)
- Postal codes: LV-1019, LV-1057, LV-1063
- Website: apkaimes.lv

Ķengarags is a neighborhood in the city of Riga, Latvia. It is located in the southern part of the city. Ķengarags borders the Daugava River to the west, the Riga-Moscow railway line to the east, Rumbula to the south, and Krasta Residential Neighborhood to the north.

== History ==
Ķengarags was the location of a Sword Brothers fort, built in 1208. Knights settled in Ķengarags even before Riga was founded. The name Ķengarags dates back to the late 16th century and is a combination of two words – Ķenga, a name of a farmer who lived in the area, and rags, the Latvian word for horn. (The Daugava River makes a horn shaped turn in the Ķengarags area.)

== Present ==
Ķengarags consists of three neighborhoods, known as Ķengarags, Ķengarags-2, and Ķengarags-3 from the north (center of Riga) to the south (outskirts) respectively. Each of these parts of Ķengarags consists of both residential and commercial areas. The main streets of Ķengarags are Lokomotīves iela and Latgales iela bordering Ķengarags on the east and west respectively. There are several public transport links with central Riga in Ķengarags. The train stations on the railway line within Ķengarags are Jāņavārti, Daugmale and Šķirotava stations. The PV train service uses the Riga-Moscow railway. From Riga Central Train Station by train it takes about 15 minutes. An alternative would be the route 7 tram which follows Latgales iela and terminates at the Dole supermarket.

Ķengarags as seen from the window of the building at 76 Lokomotīves iela. The white 9-story building is 72 Lokomotīves iela and the 5-story building to the right is 78 Lokomotīves iela.

The most commonly used method of Ķengarags residents to get to city center is the route 15 trolleybus, which runs through residential neighborhoods and terminates at the southern tip of Ķengarags on Višķu iela.

The residential areas of Ķengarags consist of private houses and apartment buildings, consisting of 4, 5, 9, and 12-story buildings. Most apartments have cable television which was installed in the last years of the Soviet period. Most other Riga neighborhoods receive their television programs through on-roof antennas. The residents of Ķengarags also benefit from the proximity of the Daugava river which is within walking distance for many people.
