= Daugmale Station =

Railway station in Riga, Latvia

Daugmale
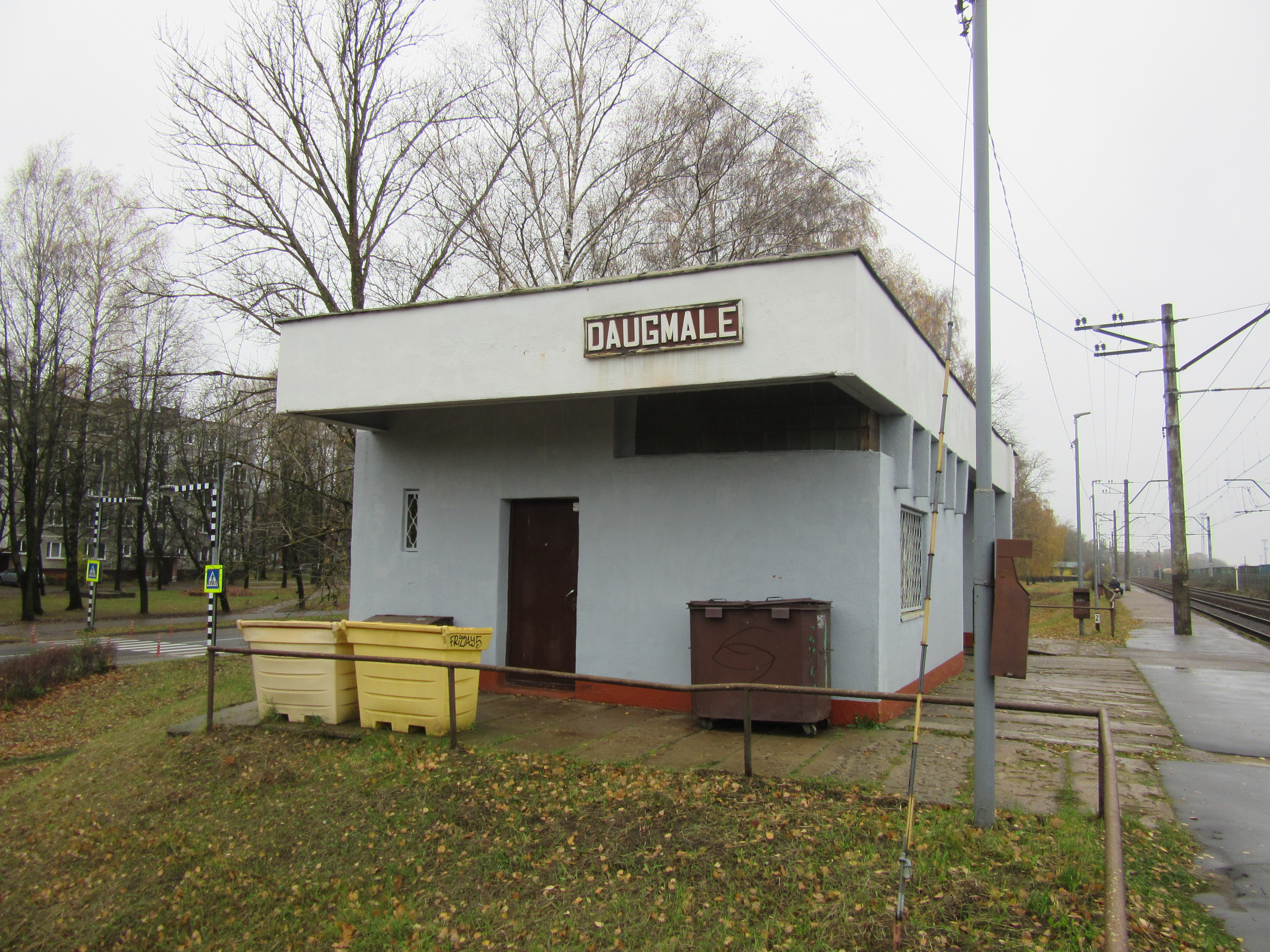

General information
- Location: Lokomotīves iela 44, Riga, LV-1057; Latvia
- Coordinates: 56°54′37.23″N 24°12′0.78″E
- Owner: Latvijas Dzelzceļš
- Platforms: 2
- Tracks: 2

History
- Opened: 1930s
- Former names: Depo, C parks

Services
Preceding station	LDz	Following station
Jāņavārti towards Riga	Riga–Daugavpils	Šķirotava towards Daugavpils
Location

Daugmale Station is a railway station on the Riga – Daugavpils Railway. The railway stop is located within the limits of Šķirotava Station. The station is located on the border of the Ķengarags and Šķirotava neighborhoods of Riga, with the station building being a part of the former.

Currently, no Vivi diesel trains to Daugavpils stop at the station. It is only served by Vivi electric trains to Ogre, Lielvārde, and Aizkraukle.

== History ==
The station was initially built in the 1930s for the needs of the workers of the Šķirotava Locomotive Depot, thus receiving the name Depo ('depot' in Latvian). Later it was renamed C parks (after the Šķirotava Station transit park), until it received the current name in 1974. The station building was also built during the Soviet occupation of Latvia.

The ticket booth at the station was closed on 1 August 2009.

== Gallery ==
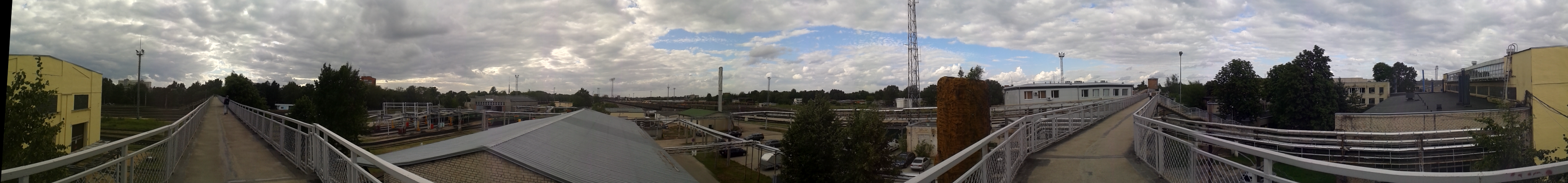
A panorama view of the cargo section of Daugmale Section

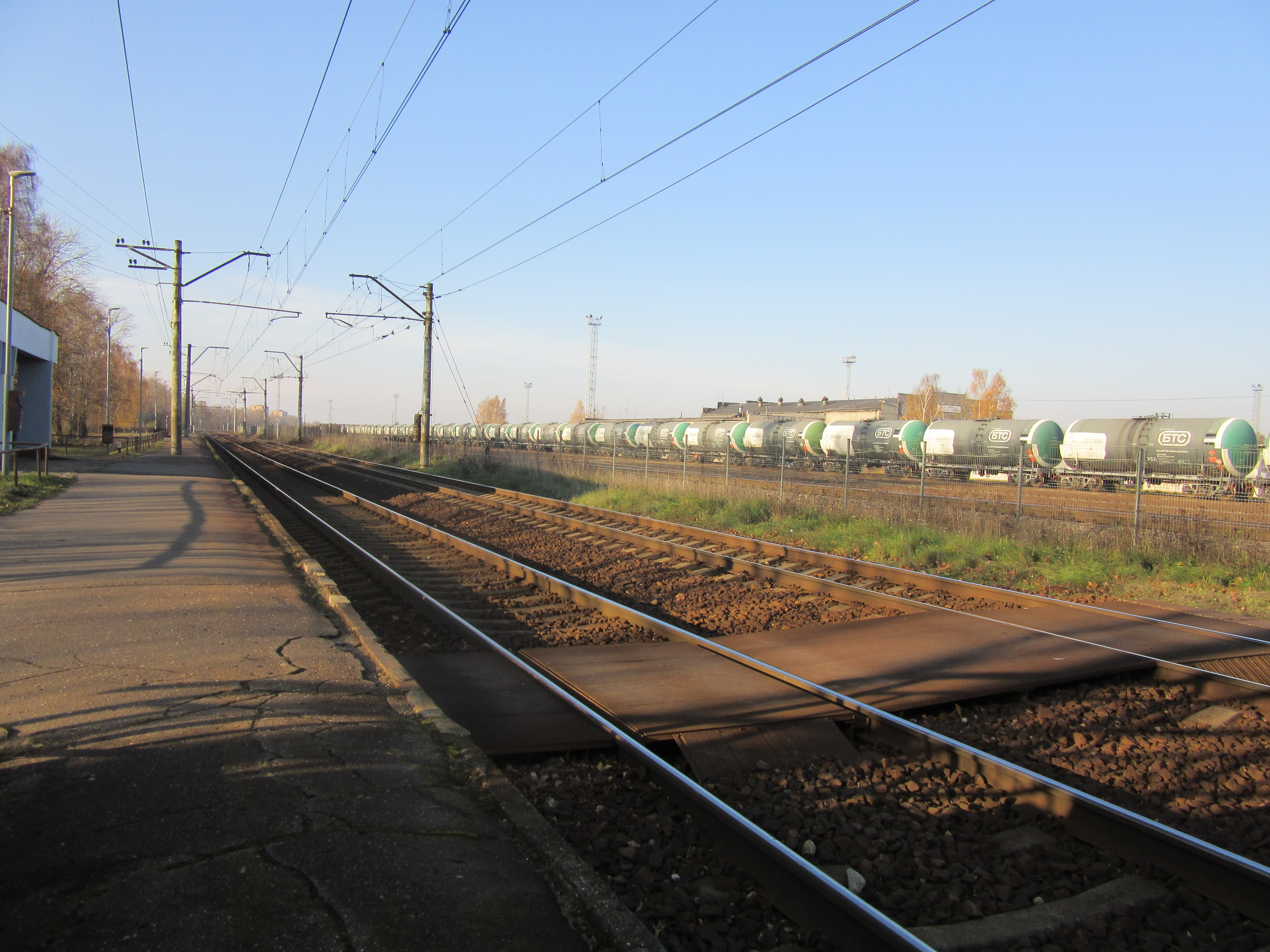
Tracks in the station

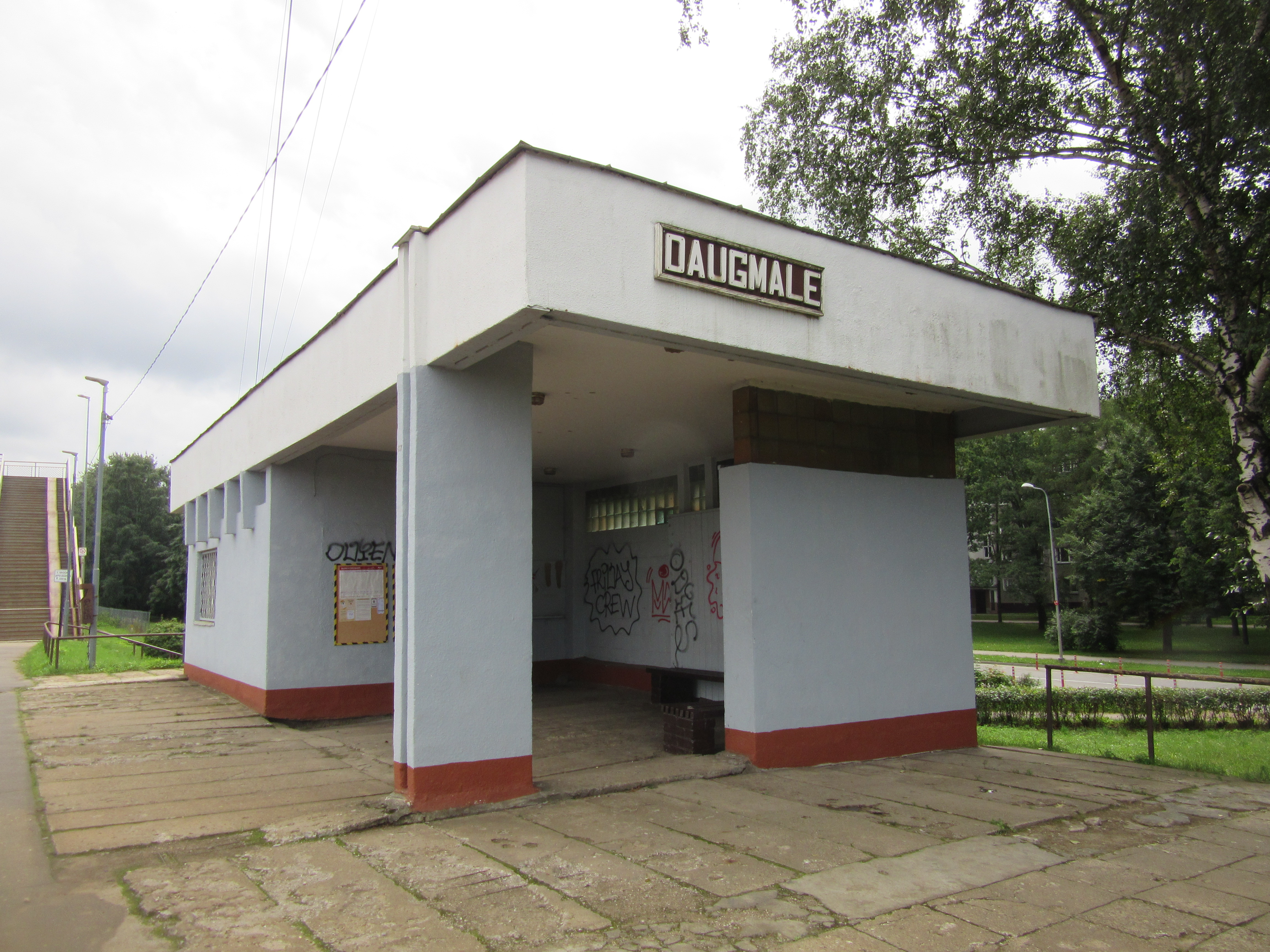
Other view of the station building
