= Latgale Suburb, Riga =

Neighbourhood of Riga, Latvia

Coordinates: 56.9200°N 24.1972°E

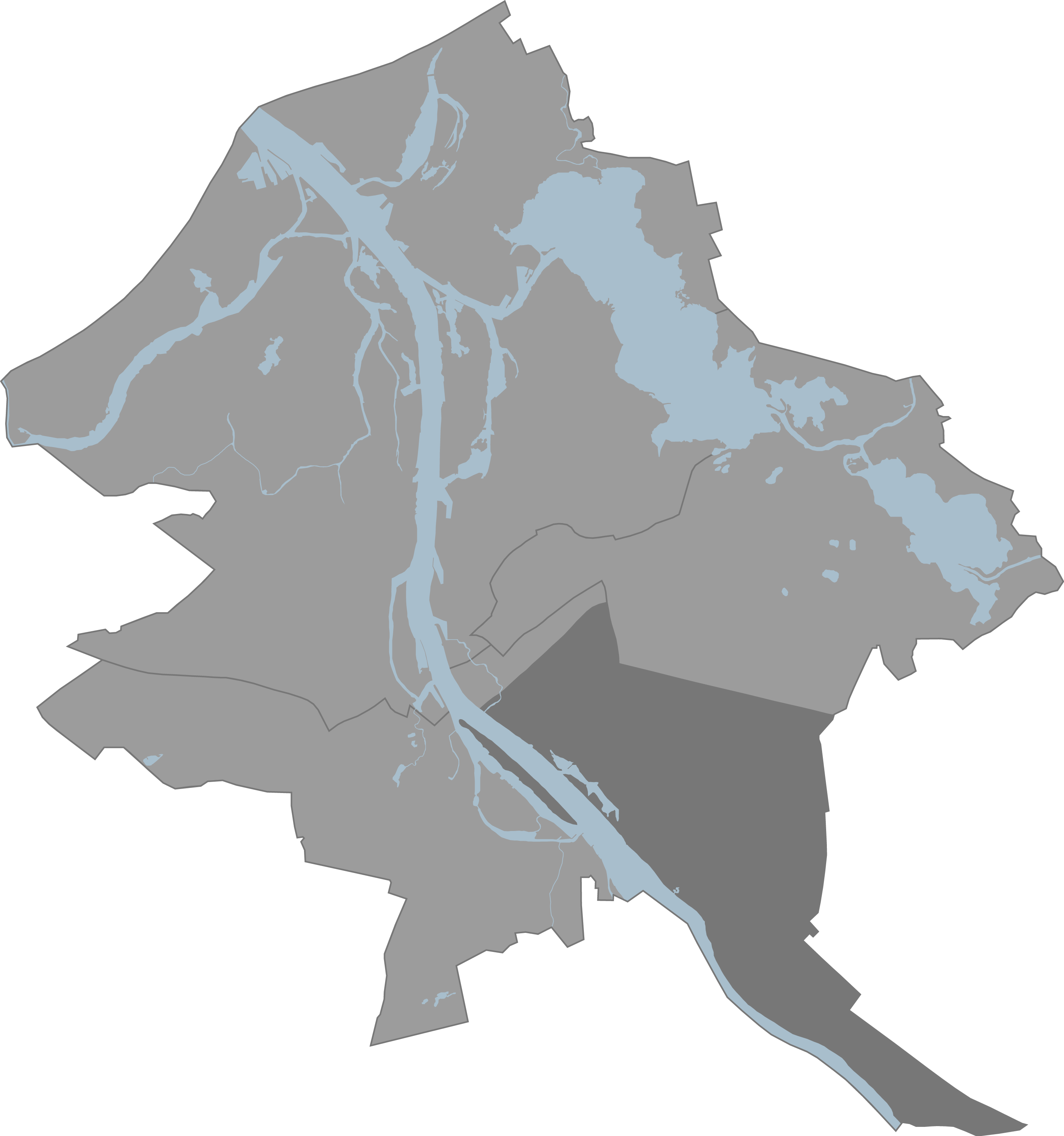

The Latgale Suburb (Latvian: Latgales priekšpilsēta) is one of six administrative districts of Riga, the capital of Latvia.

== History ==
The Latgale Suburb historically developed from several distinct parts of Riga. As early as 1208, the Livonian Brothers of the Sword built Bertold's Mill in the present-day Ķengarags neighbourhood, serving as a fortification near Riga.

In the 14th century, just beyond the city walls along the Daugava riverside, the Latgale neighbourhood emerged, housing a shipyard, sawmill, ash-burning facility, as well as warehouses, sheds, and wooden houses for laborers.

During the Swedish Livonia period, Johan Rodenburg designed a plan for the fortifications surrounding Riga's suburbs, with a street layout within this arc. The plan was approved in 1652 by Riga's Governor-General Gustav Horn. For defense and trade purposes, a canal was dug along the current Dzirnavu Street up to what is now Marijas Street, later named Rodenburg's Ditch (filled in during the latter half of the 19th century). During the Great Northern War, the suburbs were burned down, and the canal's construction remained unfinished.

After the war and Riga's incorporation into the Russian Empire, Belarusian rafters settled along the Daugava River beyond Rodenburg's Ditch. Refugees persecuted in Russia, such as Old Believers, also found sanctuary here, and by 1760, the Grebenstchikov Old Believer House of Prayer was established. In 1766, regulations were issued regarding Jewish residence in Riga, allowing Jews to live in the settlement beyond the city gates (Jāņavārti) for six weeks for trade purposes, where the first Jewish prayer house, Peitav Synagogue, was also permitted.

In 1771, a redesign plan for Riga's suburbs was created, proposing a new line of fortifications (palisades) near what is now Matīsa Street. In 1774, the suburbs were divided into two administrative districts—Petersburg and Moscow Suburbs, with their boundary running along present-day Krišjāņa Barona Street. During the french invasion of Russia in 1812, the buildings in the Moscow Suburb were again burned down.

After the war, Riga's Governor-General Filippo Paulucci ordered the preparation of a reconstruction plan for the suburbs in 1813. In the Moscow Suburb, the Riga Church of Jesus was built between 1818 and 1822. Following the decision to dismantle Riga’s fortifications, Johann Felsko designed a new development plan for the suburbs in 1856–1857. Wealthy Jewish merchants from Russia's Pale of Settlement and Russian factory workers from central provinces began settling in the newly developed suburbs.

After 1888, the Moscow Suburb was renamed the "Moscow City District", or "Moscow Outer Riga," jeb "Maskavas Aprīgu" and divided into several police precincts. This period marked the start of intensive factory construction, which continued until the outbreak of war in 1914.

In 1859, the former Jāņa Dambis was renamed Moscow Street (now Latgales Street), extended in 1867 to Ķeizara Street (now Dzērvju Street), in 1914 to Kišiņeva Street (now Ķengaraga Street), and in 1917 to Prūšu Krogs (roughly to Glūdas Street).

After World War I, the Moscow Suburb was renamed the Latgale Suburb. In 1924, the administrative boundaries of the Latgale Suburb were expanded to include Ķengarags and parts of Dreiliņi Parish (Dreiliņbuša), covering present-day Dārzciems, parts of Šķirotava, and Pļavnieki neighborhoods. Between 1938 and 1940, Moscow Street was called Latgale Street and extended in 1939 to the Šķirotava Railway Station (Rasas Street).

After the Soviet occupation of Latvia in 1940, the Latgale Suburb was renamed the Moscow District in 1941. In 1968, the Moscow District's territory was expanded to include present-day Šķirotava, Pļavnieki, Rumbula, and Dārziņi neighborhoods. After the restoration of Latvian independence in 1991, the name Latgale Suburb was reinstated.
