= Dārzciems =

Neighbourhood of Riga, Latvia

- Neighbourhood of Riga
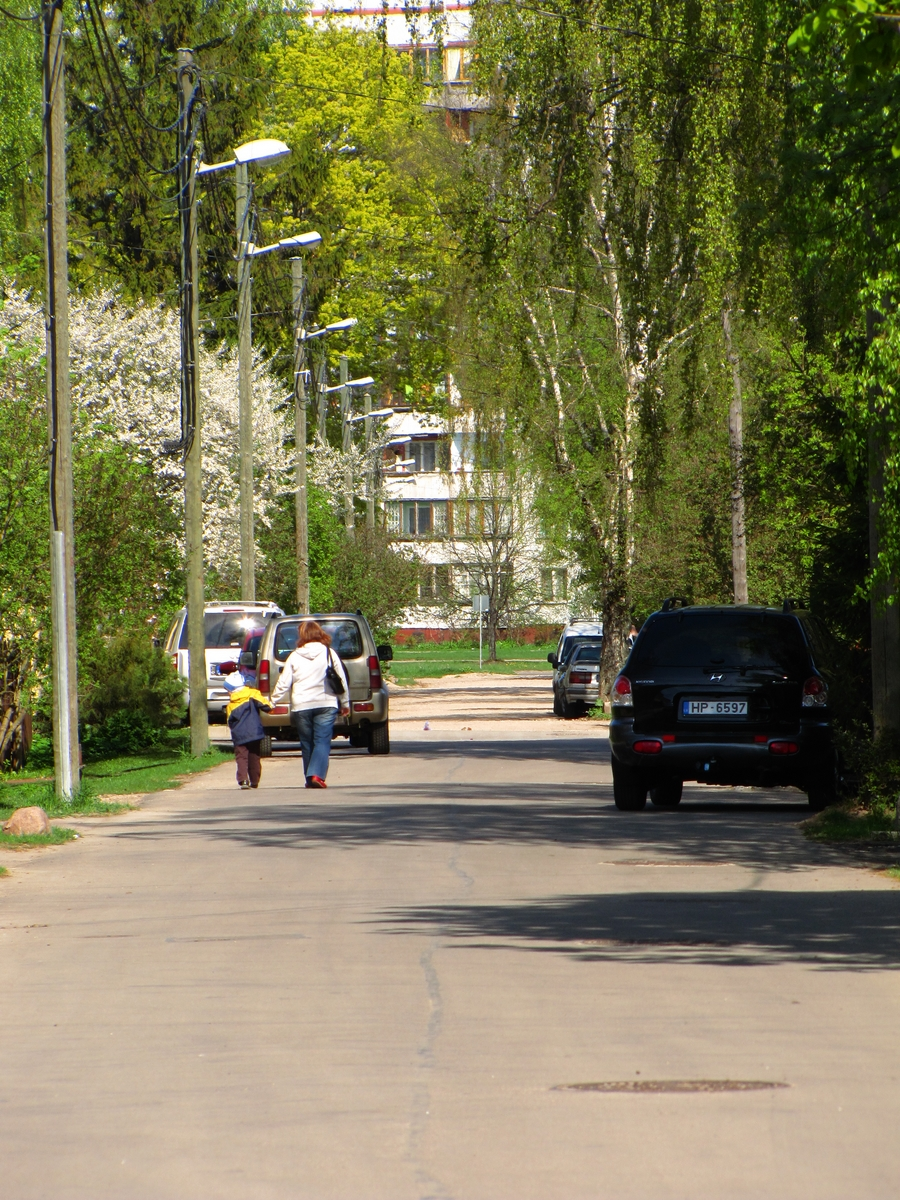
- Preiļu iela in Dārzciems

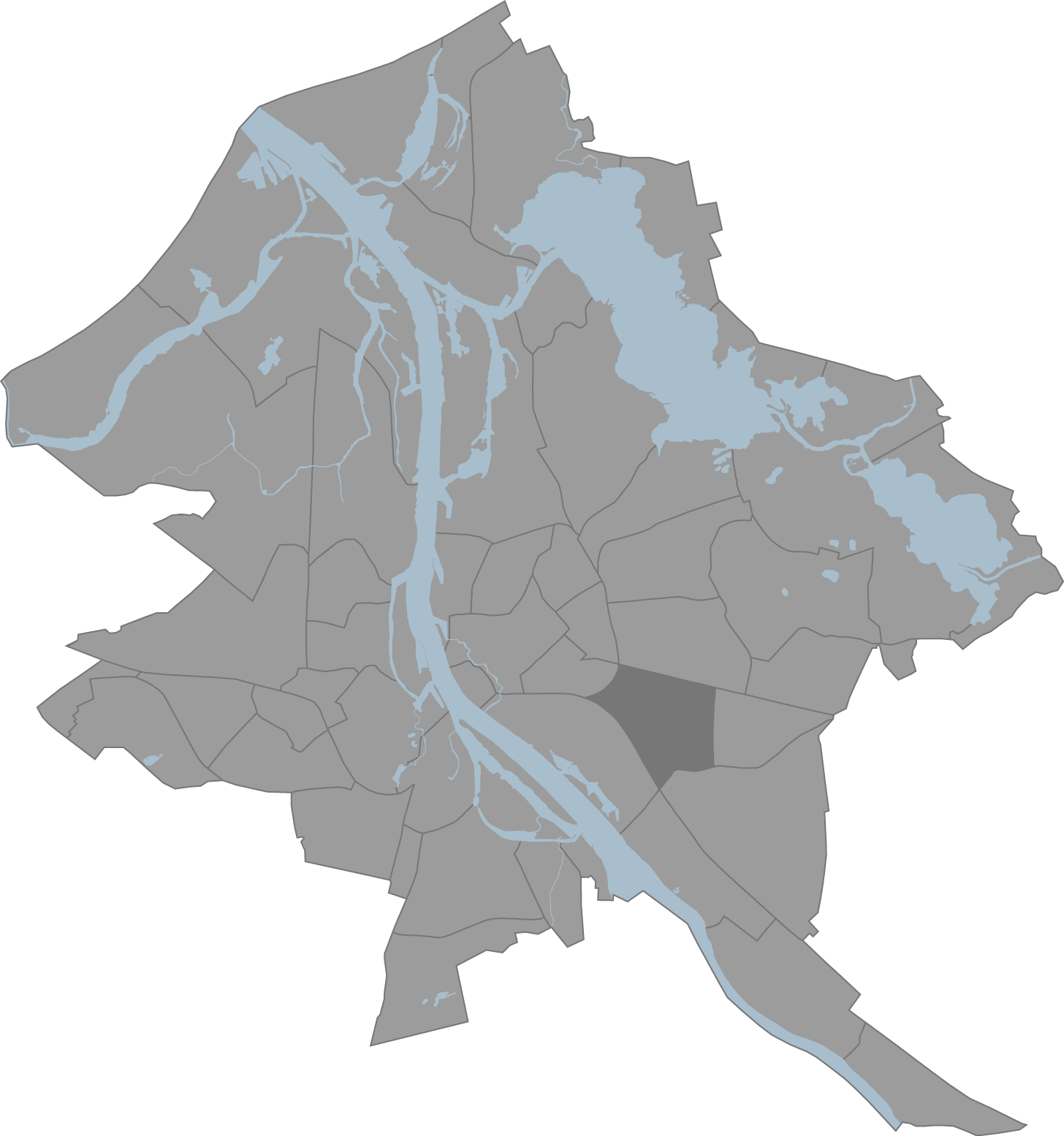
- Coordinates: 56°56′24″N 24°10′43″E
- Country: Latvia
- City: Riga
- District: Latgale Suburb

Area
  - Total: 4.577 km^{2} (1.767 sq mi)

Population (2024)
  - Total: 17,599
  - Density: 3,845/km^{2} (9,959/sq mi)
- Time zone: UTC+2 (EET)
  - Summer (DST): UTC+3 (EEST)
- Website: apkaimes.lv

Dārzciems (literal Latvian - 'garden village') is a neighborhood of Riga located in the Latgale Suburb in the southeastern part of the right bank of the Daugava river. With a population of about 21,000 inhabitants in 2010, Dārzciems's territory covers 4.577 km^{2} (1.767 sq mi) and is one of the most arid parts of Riga. The western part of Dārzciems mainly consists of one-or two-story private buildings, while the northwestern part is dominated by multi-storied housing blocks.

The territory of neighborhood was added to Riga in 1924 with plans to develop it as a 'garden city' with small private houses and gardens around them. During the 1970s, some of the old private houses were demolished and several 3- to 9-storey apartment blocks were built for the needs of Soviet Army officers. Later, several big industrial enterprises built apartments for their workers there (e.g. the Aldaris brewery). During the Soviet era Dārzciems was the location of the well-known Lubāna department store, which in 2004 was renovated into a Rimi supermarket.

== Gallery ==
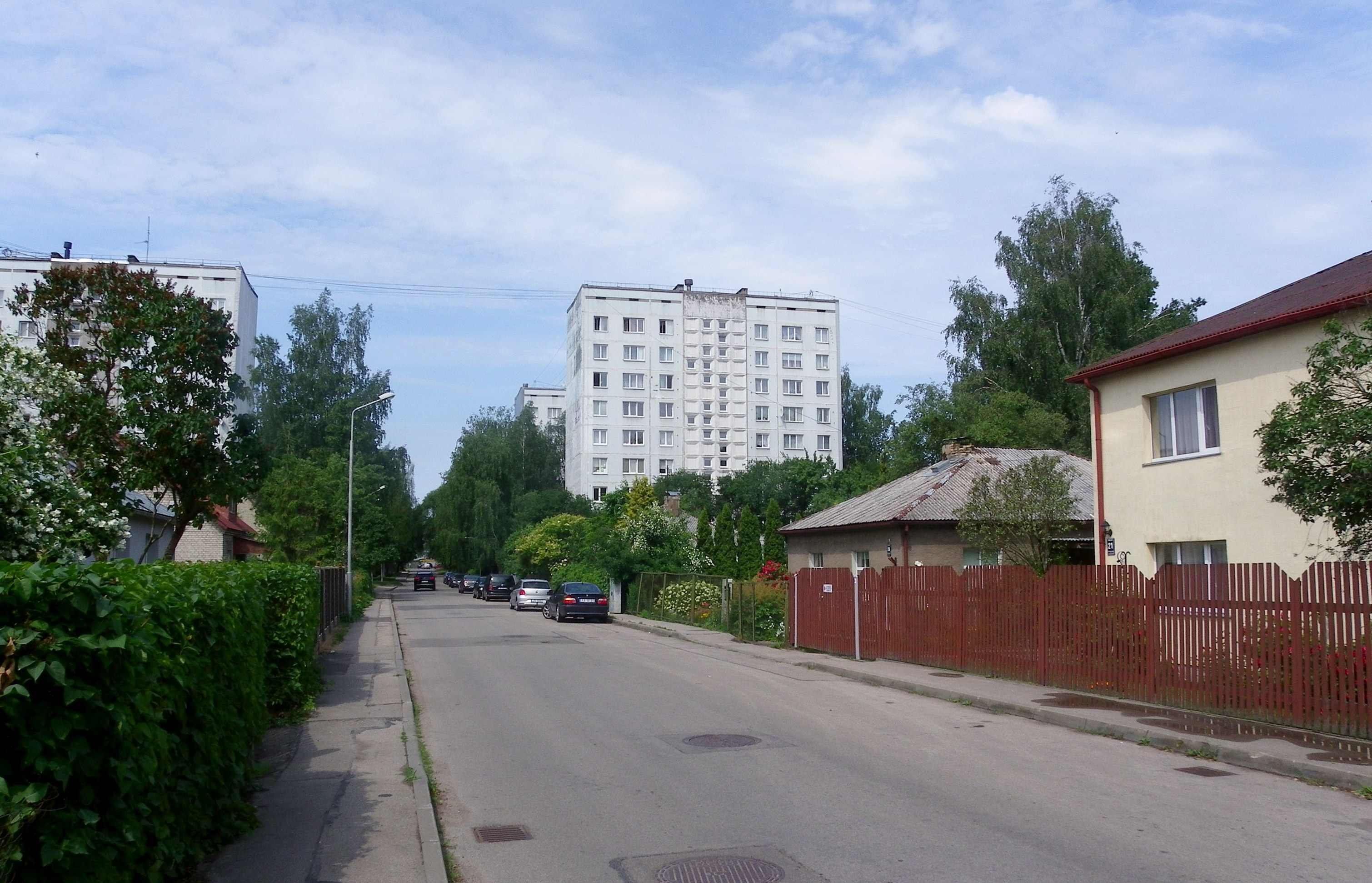
Private houses and apartment blocks on Zeltiņu iela

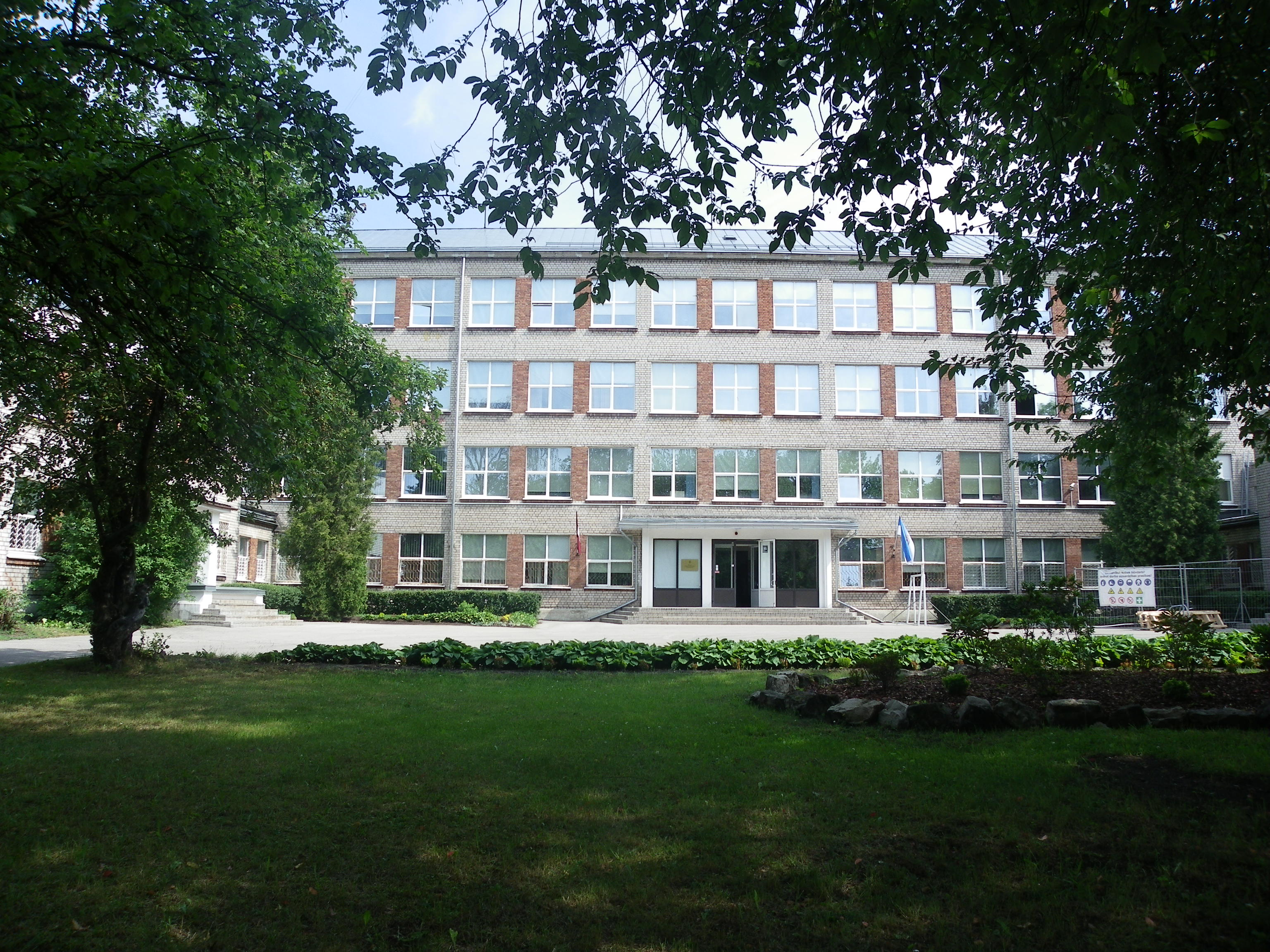
Riga Sergejs Žoltoks Secondary School

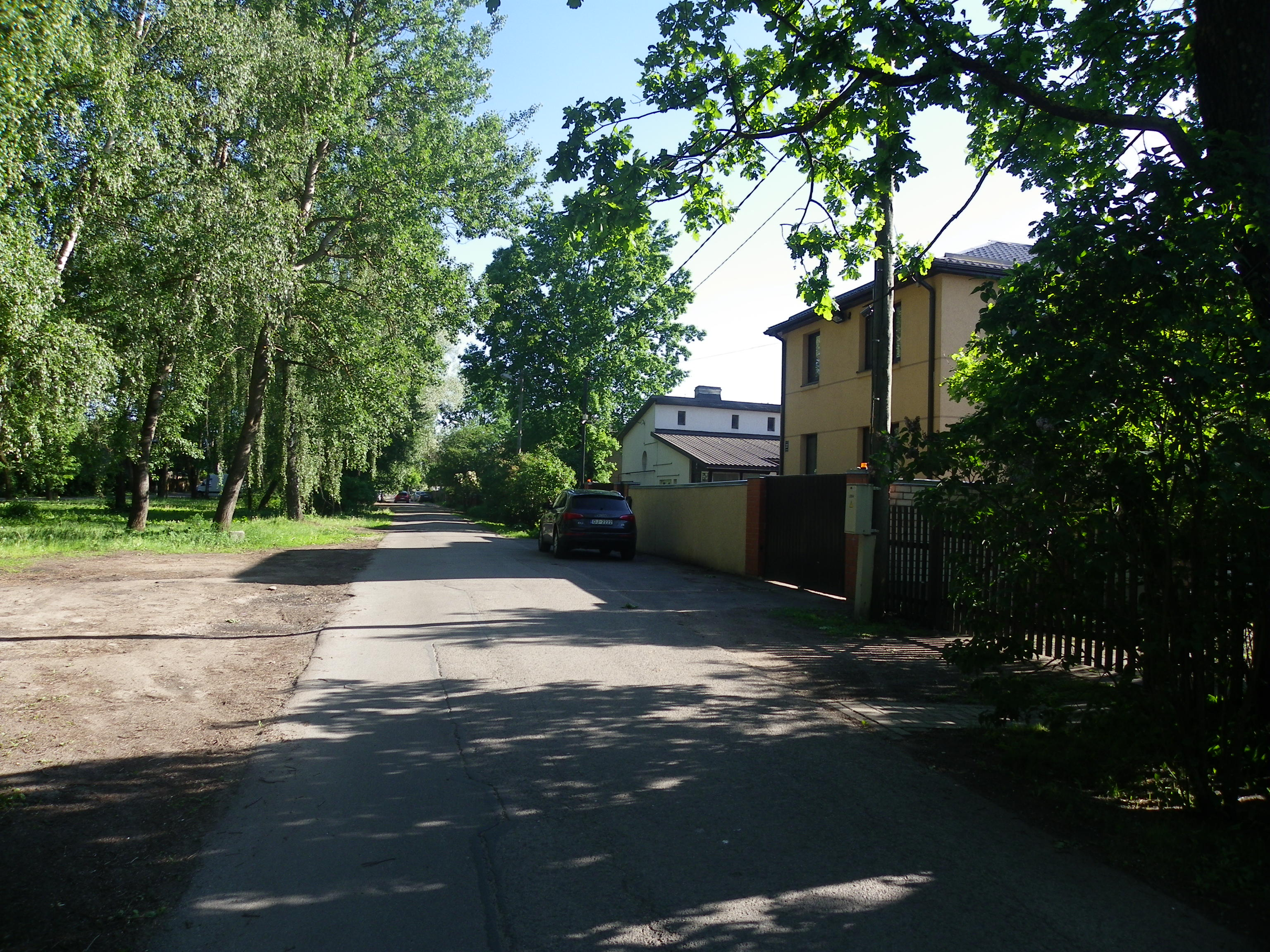
Gaismas iela in Dārzciems
