= Pļavnieki =

Neighborhood of Riga, Latvia

Coordinates: 56°56′24″N 24°12′28″E

- Neighborhood of Riga
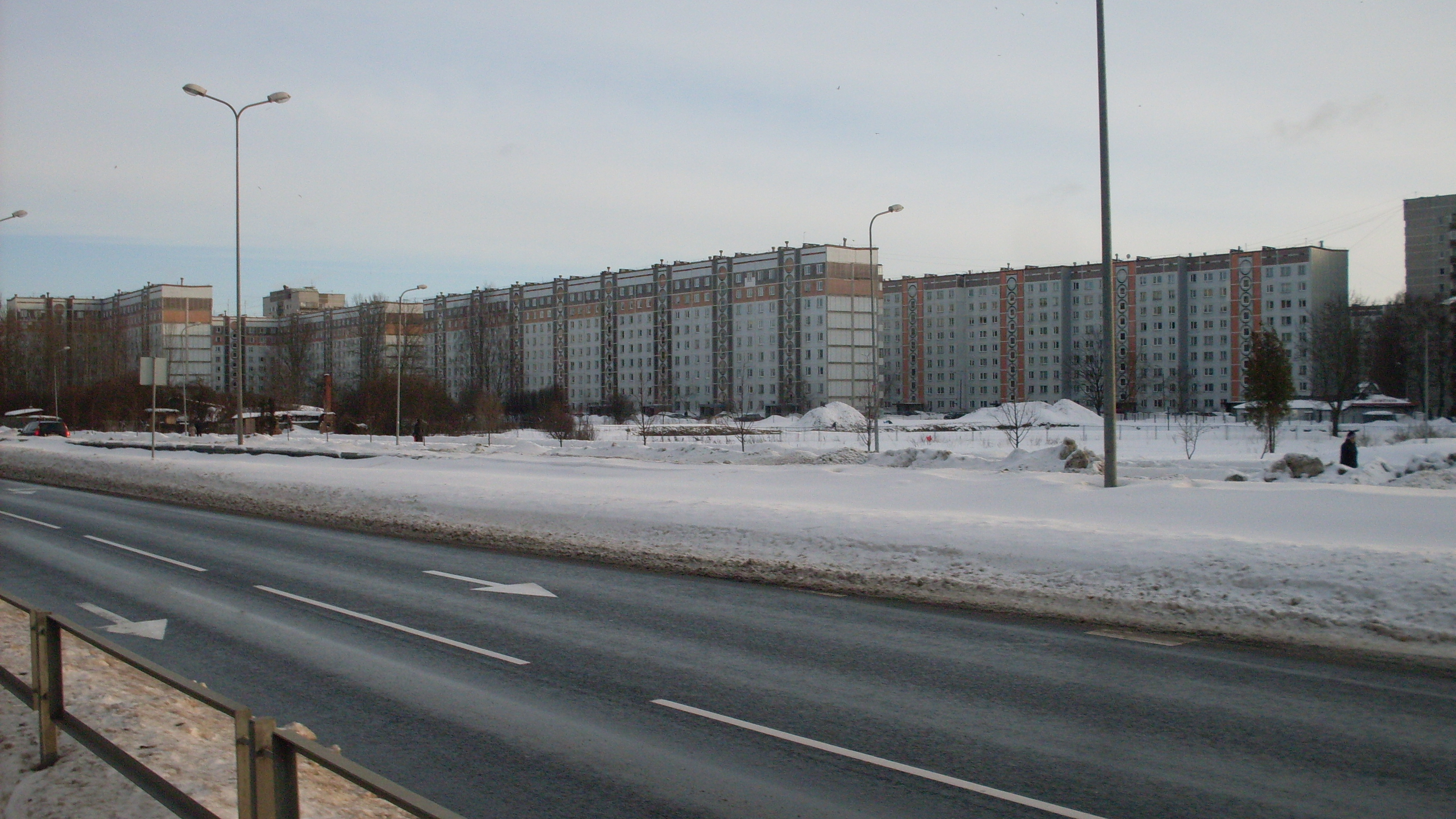
- Apartment buildings built during Soviet era along Augusta Deglava street

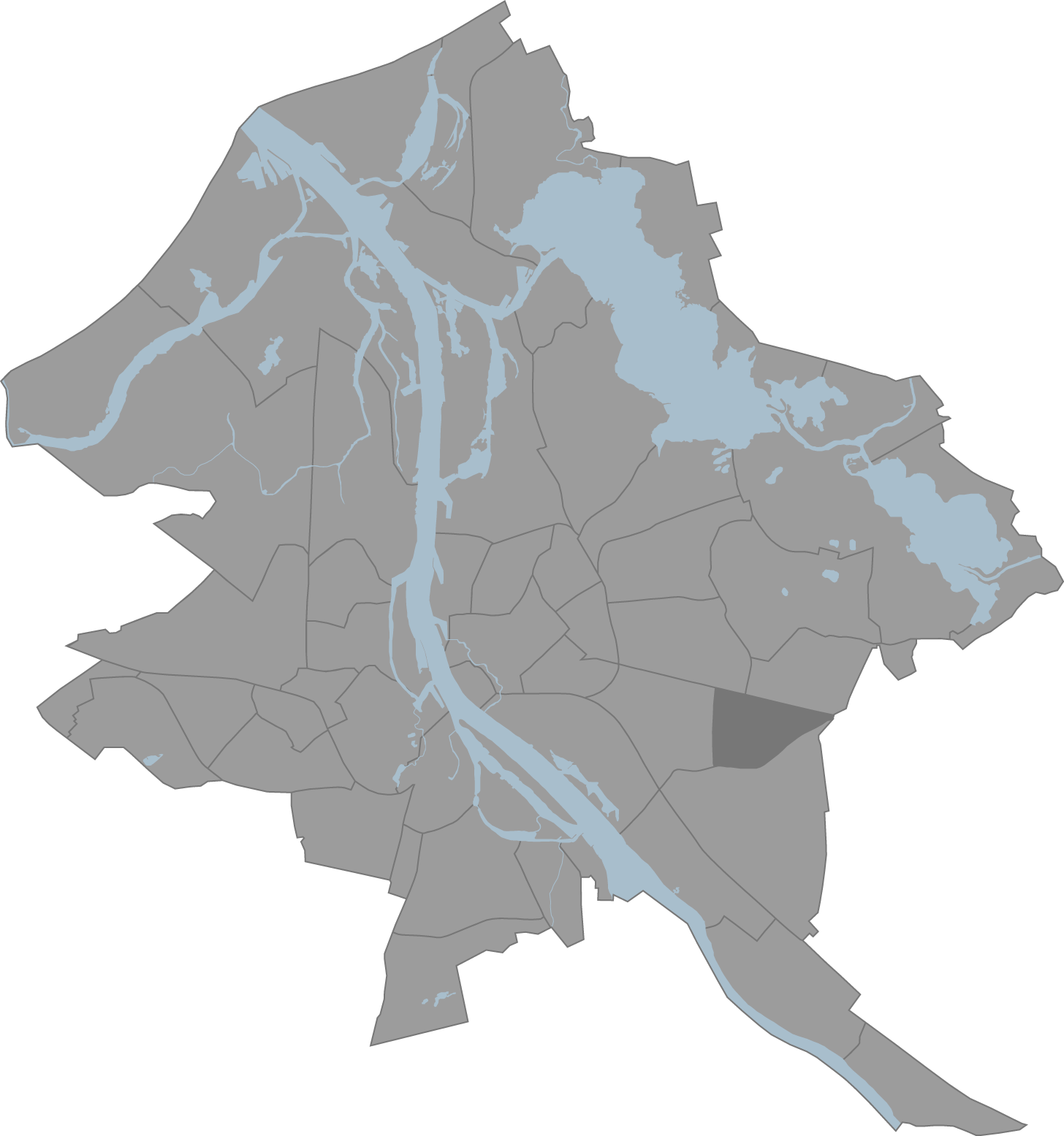
- Location in Riga
- Country: Latvia
- City: Riga
- District: Latgale Suburb

Area
  - Total: 2,985 km^{2} (1,153 sq mi)

Population (2024)
  - Total: 39,709
  - Density: 13.30/km^{2} (34.45/sq mi)
- Time zone: UTC+2 (EET)
  - Summer (DST): UTC+3 (EEST)
- Postal codes: LV-1021, LV-1082
- Website: apkaimes.lv/plavnieki/

Pļavnieki is a neighbourhood of Riga, Latvia, situated to the right of the river Daugava. It is one of the most densely inhabited neighbourhoods in Riga. Russian is widely spoken in the city, along with the national language of Latvian. The Pļavinieki neighborhood was annexed to the city of Riga in 1974.

== Gallery ==
Andreja Saharova street in Pļavnieki

Typical inner yard in Pļavnieki

Wintertime in Pļavnieki. Year 2007

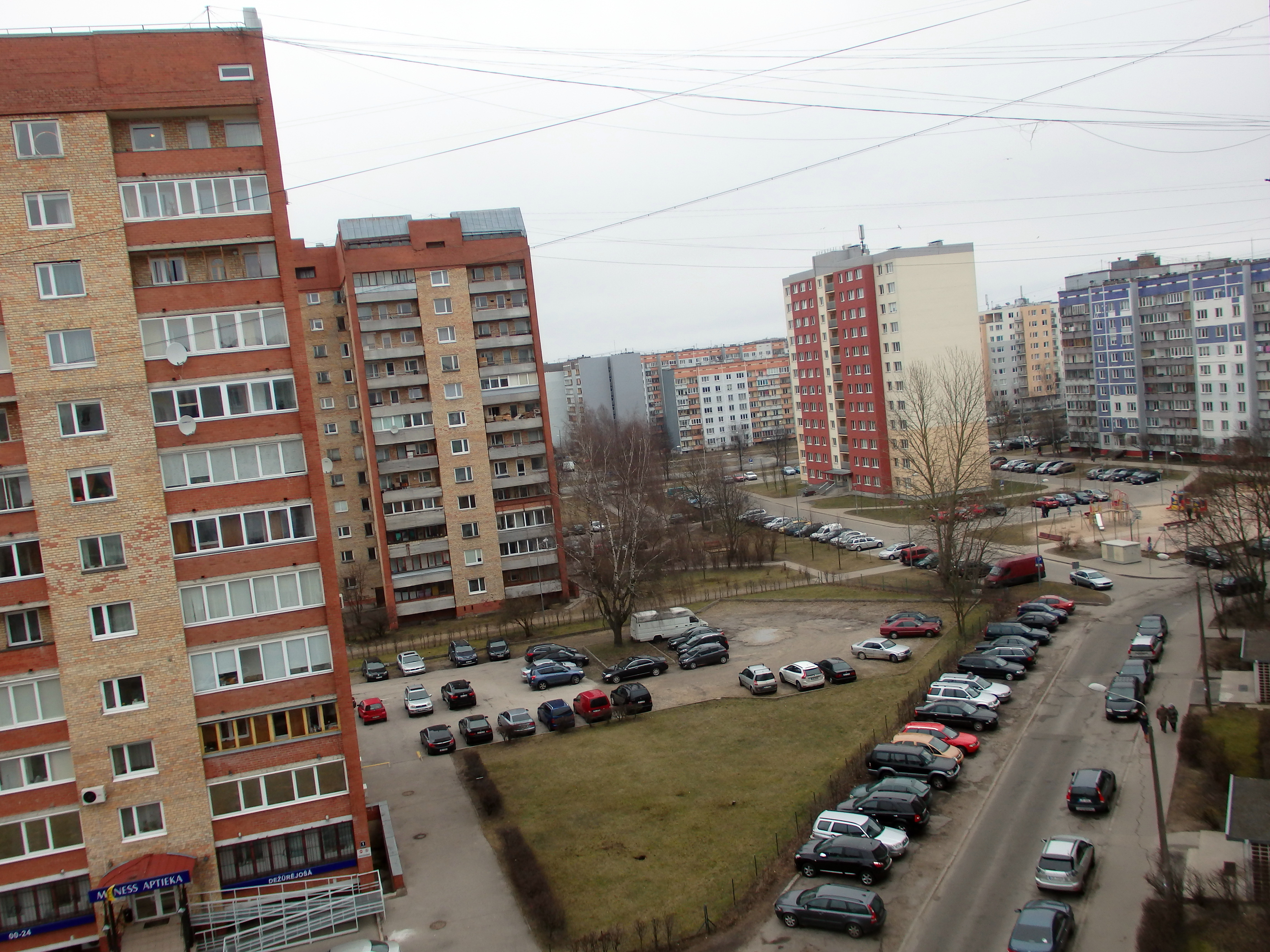
View from apartment in Plavnieki suburb

18-floor apartment buildings on Lubānas Street 123

Post soviet architecture in Pļavnieki.
