= Šķirotava =

Neighborhood of Riga, Latvia

- Neighborhood of Riga
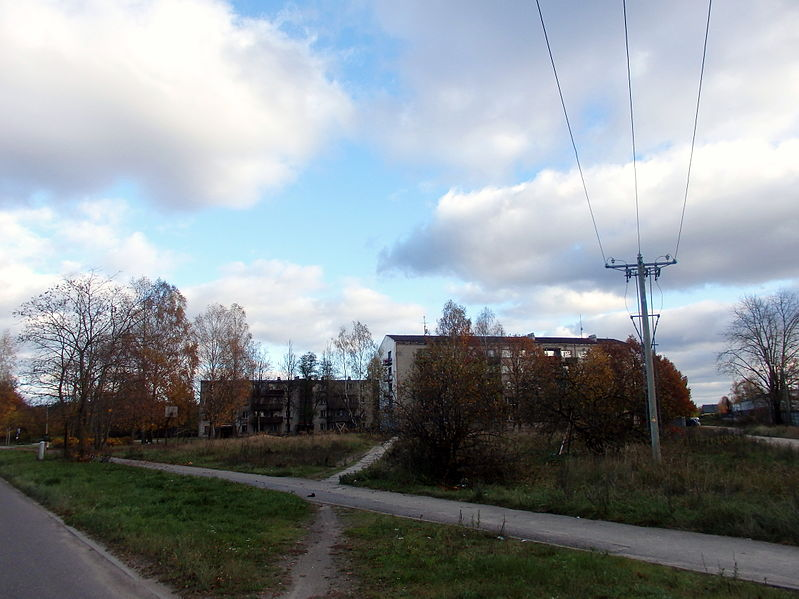
- Sila street in Šķirotava.

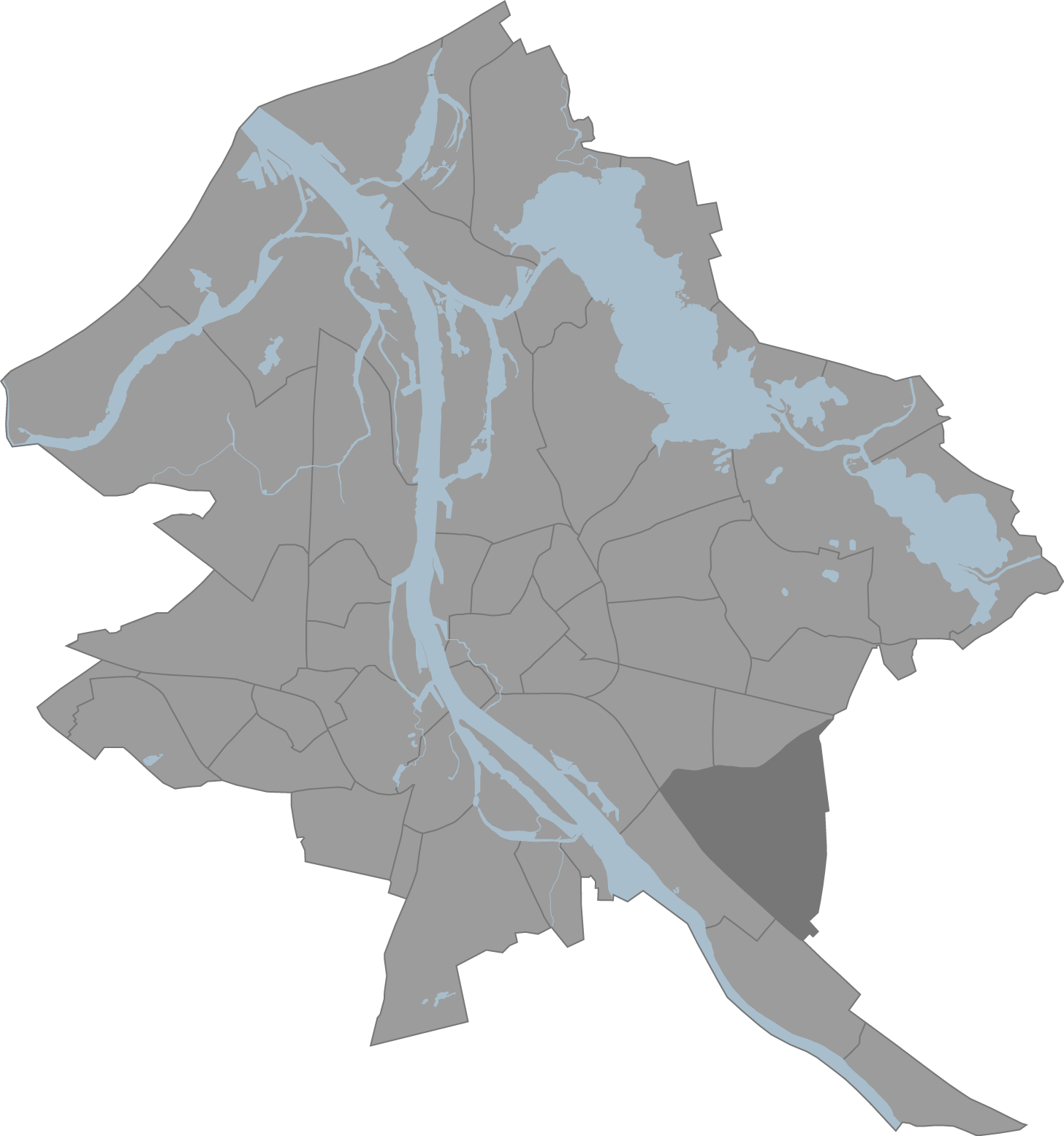
- Location in Riga
- Coordinates: 56°55′03″N 24°12′25″E
- Country: Latvia
- City: Riga
- District: Latgale Suburb, Riga

Area
  - Total: 10.057 km^{2} (3.883 sq mi)

Population (2024)
  - Total: 2,020
  - Density: 201/km^{2} (520/sq mi)
- Time zone: UTC+2 (EET)
  - Summer (DST): UTC+3 (EEST)

Šķirotava is a neighbourhood of Riga, the capital of Latvia. It is located in the Latgale Suburb of Riga close to the city's southeastern border. The perfect way to get there is by Rīgas Satiksme companies buses: N3, N13, N15, N20, N34, N47, N48, N50, N52 or trolleybuses N16 and N22. The neighborhood is serviced by Šķirotava station.

== Sources ==
- Jērāns, Pēteris (1988). Latvijas padomju enciklopēdija: Rīga. Rīga: Valērija Belokoņa izdevniecība. p. 733. ISBN 9984-9482-2-6.
