= Vagonu Parks Station =

Railway station in Riga, Latvia

Vagonu Parks
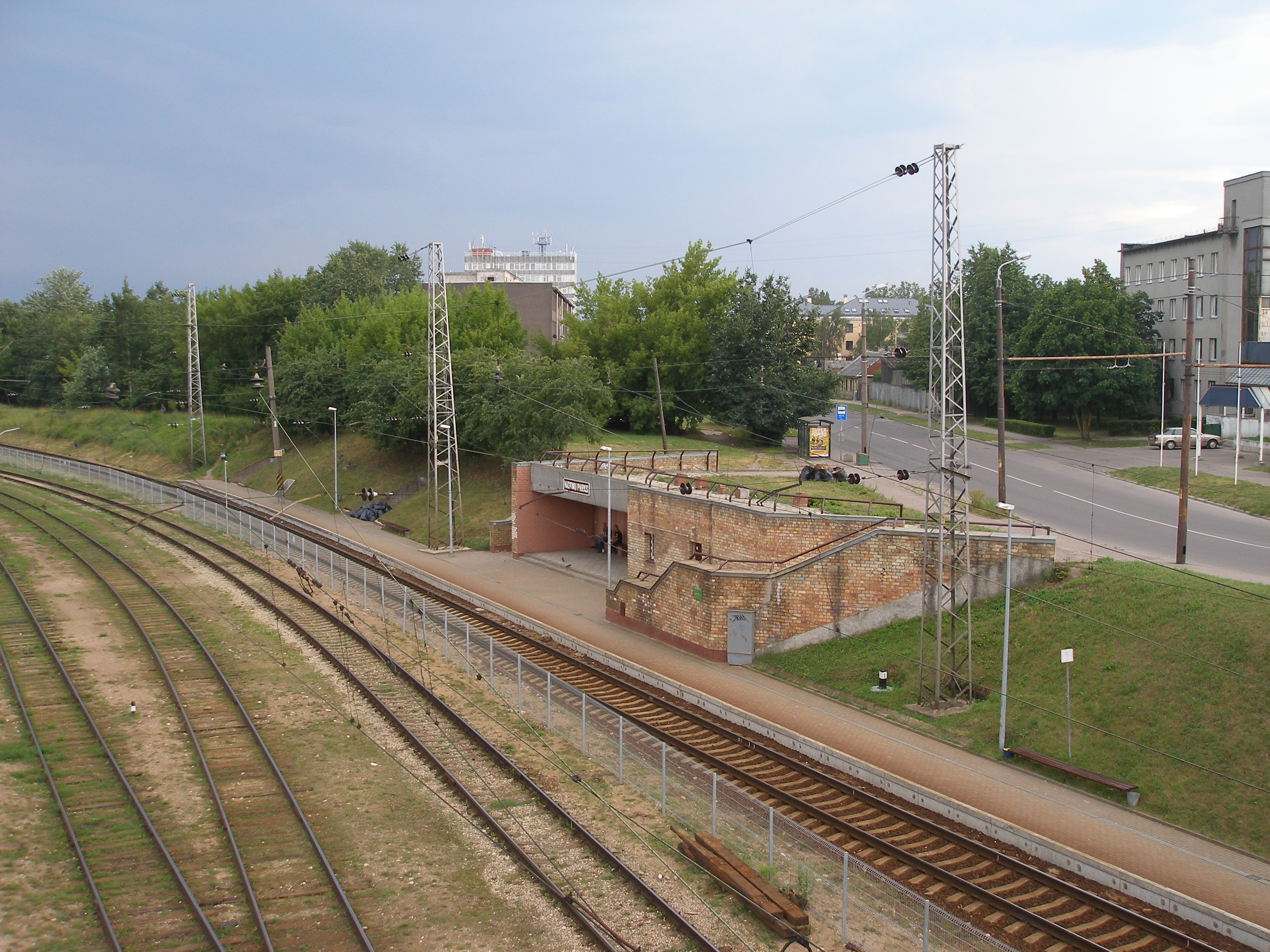

General information
- Location: Rīga, Kalna iela, LV-1003; Latvia
- Coordinates: 56°56′38.48″N 24°9′25.03″E
- Operator: Latvian Railways
- Line: Riga – Daugavpils Railway
- Platforms: 3
- Tracks: 3

History
- Former names: Kalpaka Parks

Services
Preceding station	LDz	Following station
Riga Central towards Riga	Riga–Daugavpils	Jāņavārti towards Daugavpils
Location

Vagonu Parks Station is a railway station in Riga Municipality on the Riga–Aizkraukle regional line and the Riga–Daugavpils Railway Line.
