= Rumbula, Riga =

Neighborhood of Riga, Latvia

Rumbula
- Neighbourhood of Riga
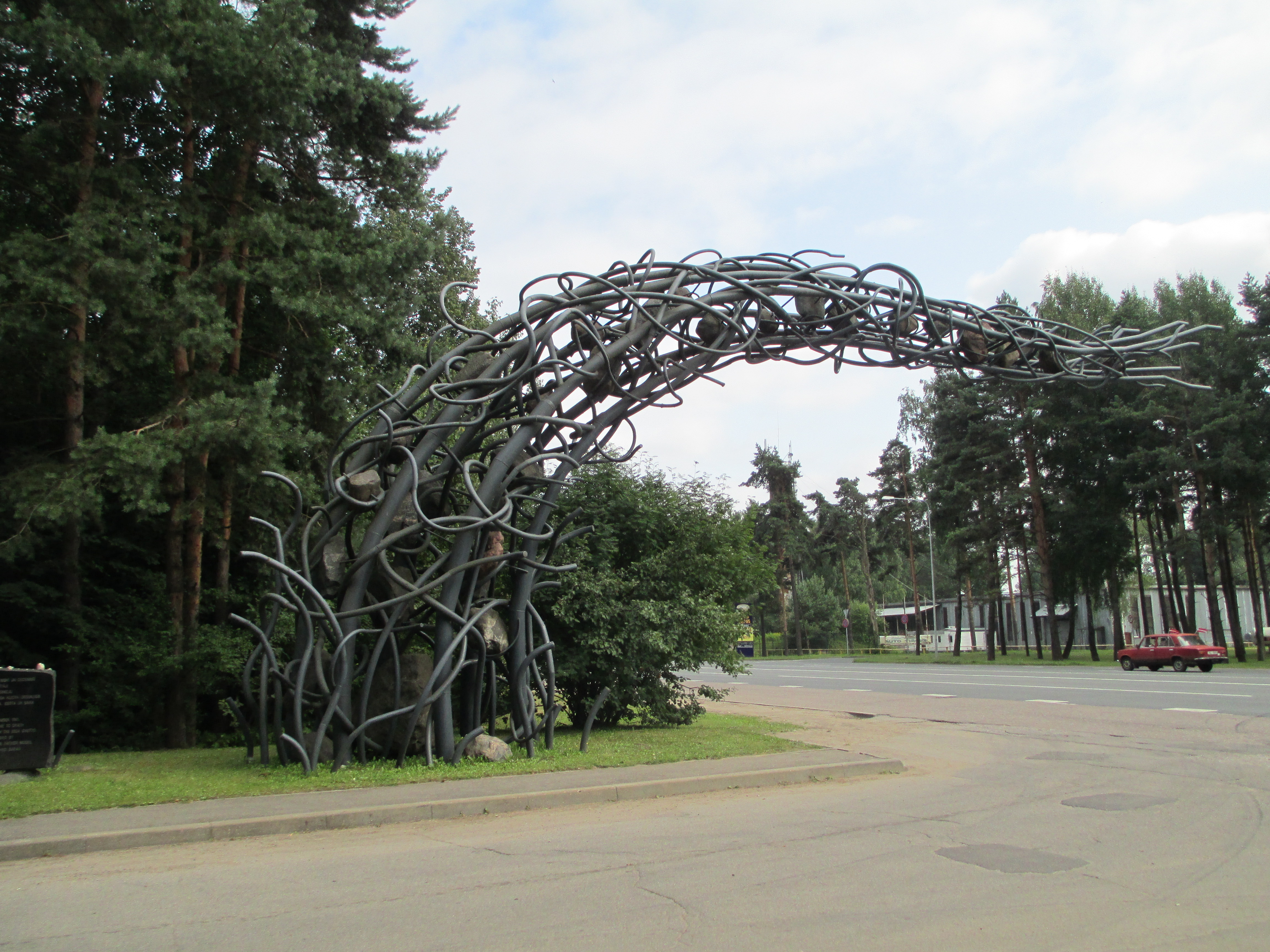
- Entrance to Rumbula Forest and the memorial

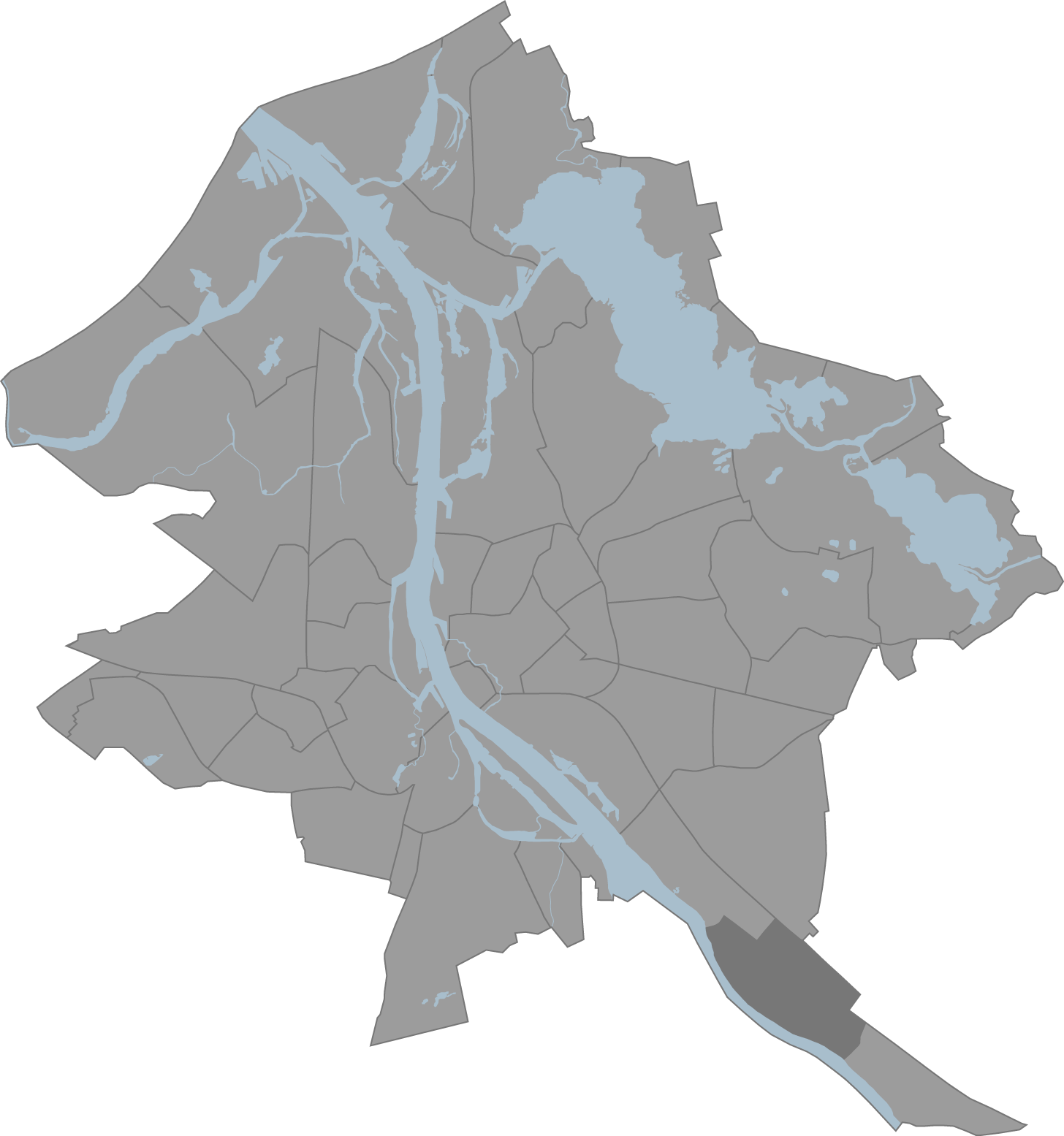
- Rumbula within Riga
- Coordinates: 56°54′N 24°18′E
- Country: Latvia
- City: Riga
- District: Latgale Suburb

Area
  - Total: 6.978 km^{2} (2.694 sq mi)

Population (2017)
  - Total: 1,056
  - Density: 151.3/km^{2} (392.0/sq mi)
- Time zone: UTC+2 (EET)
  - Summer (DST): UTC+3 (EEST)
- Postal code: LV-1063
- Website: apkaimes.lv/rumbula/

Rumbula is a neighbourhood of Riga located in the Latgale Suburb, on the right bank of the Daugava river. With a population of about 882 inhabitants in 2024, Rumbula's territory covers 6.978 km^{2} (2.694 sq mi).

Rumbula is also the home of Rumbula Air Base, a defunct airport formerly used by Soviet and Latvian armies. Rumbula is home to Kurbads Ice Hall, which serves as the home arena of the ice hockey team HK Kurbads.

Rumbula is served by the Rumbula Station on the Riga–Daugavpils Railway.

== Rumbula Massacre ==
Rumbula is perhaps best known as a pine forest enclave, in which about 25,000 Jews were massacred during the Rumbula massacre in 1941, part of the Holocaust. The massacre encompasses two incidents on two non-consecutive days (November 30 and December 8, 1941) in which about 25,000 Jews were killed in or on the way to Rumbula forest near Riga, Latvia, during the Holocaust. Except for the Babi Yar massacre in Ukraine, this was the biggest two-day Holocaust atrocity until the operation of the death camps. About 24,000 of the victims were Latvian Jews from the Riga Ghetto and approximately 1,000 were German Jews transported to the forest by train. The Rumbula massacre was carried out by the Nazi Einsatzgruppe A with the help of local collaborators of the Arajs Kommando, with support from other such Latvian auxiliaries

== Gallery ==
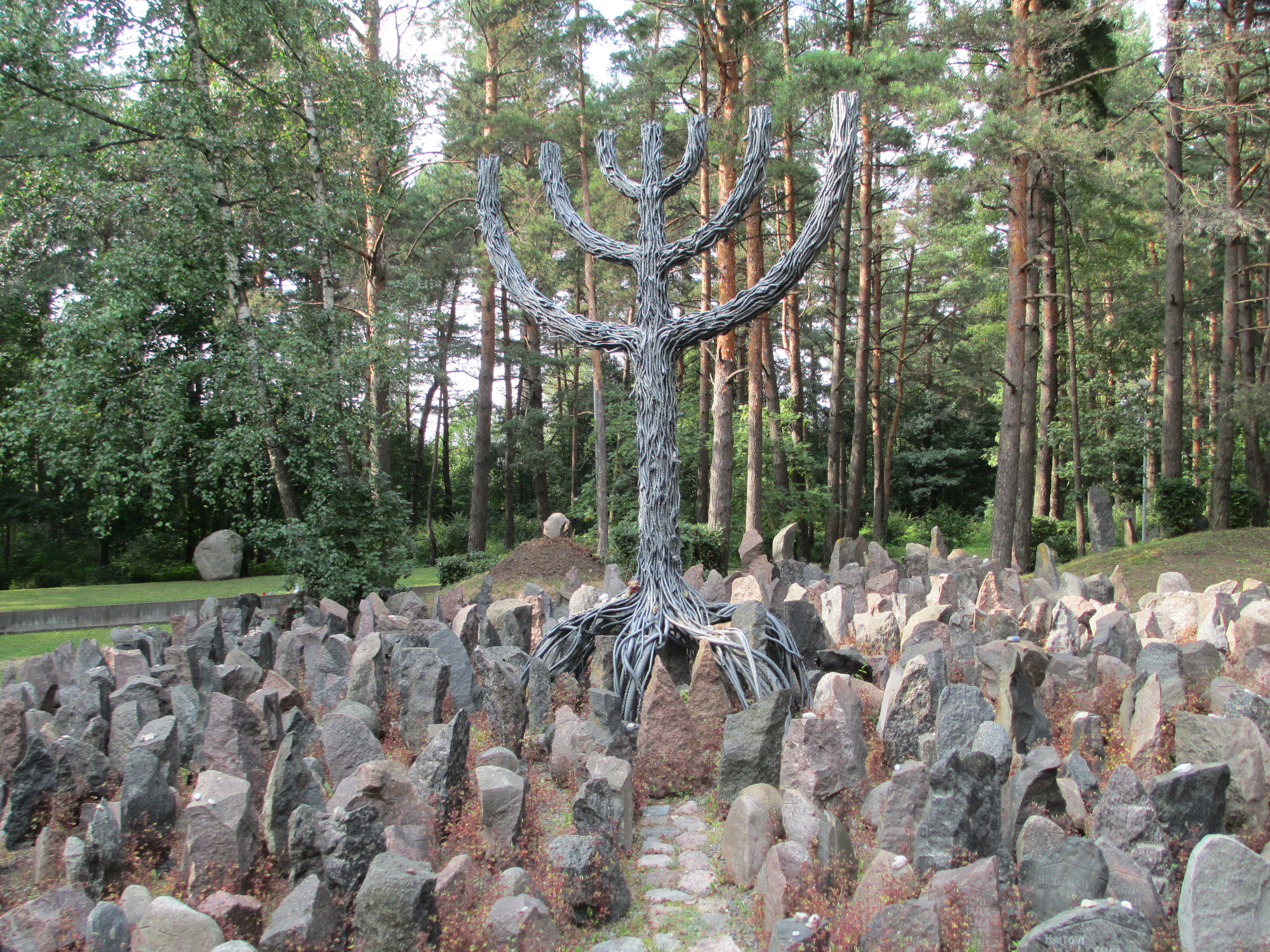
Rumbula memorial

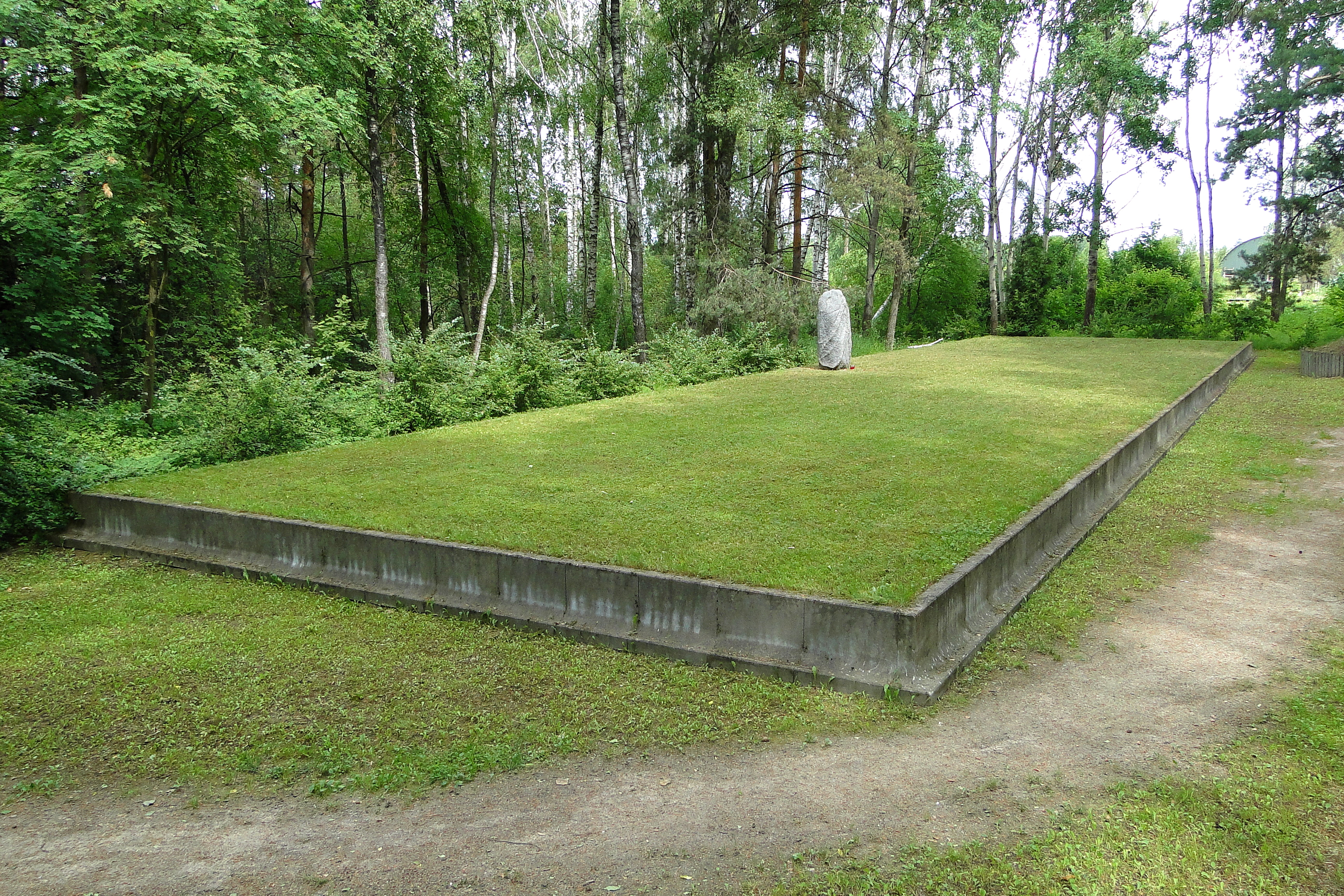
Mass grave

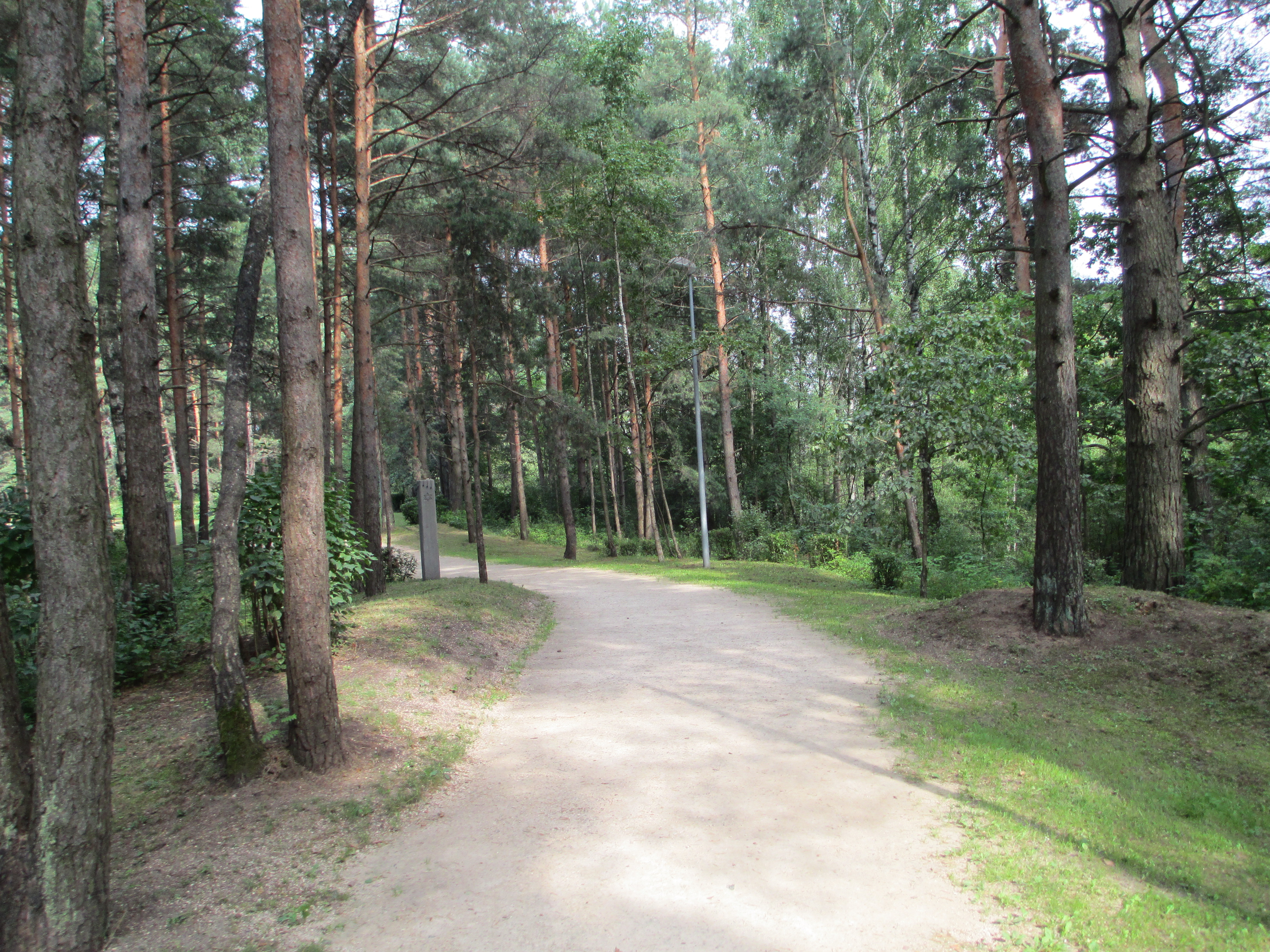
Rumbula killing site

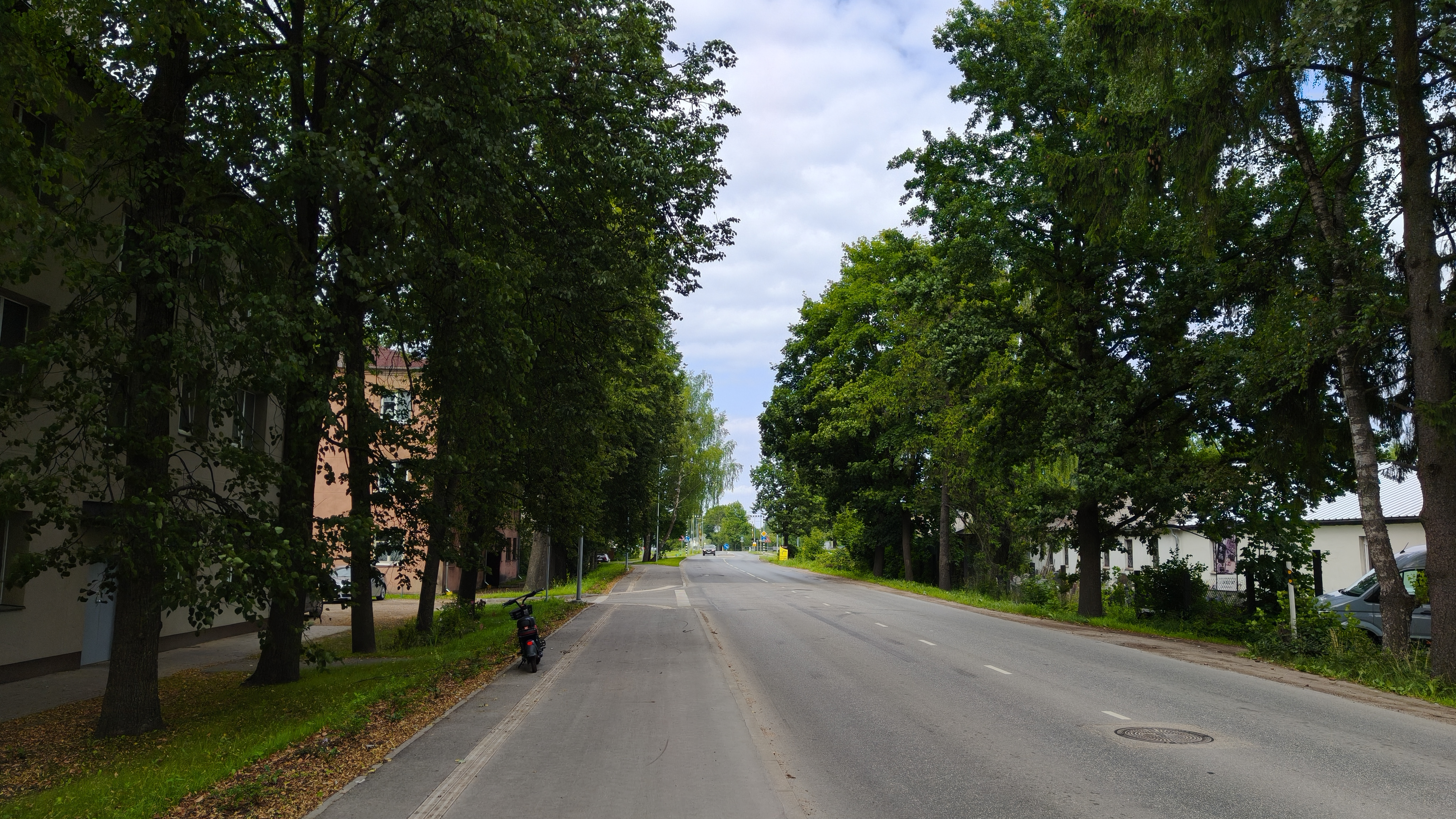
Krustpils street
