= Jāņavārti Station =

Railway station in Latvia

Jāņavārti
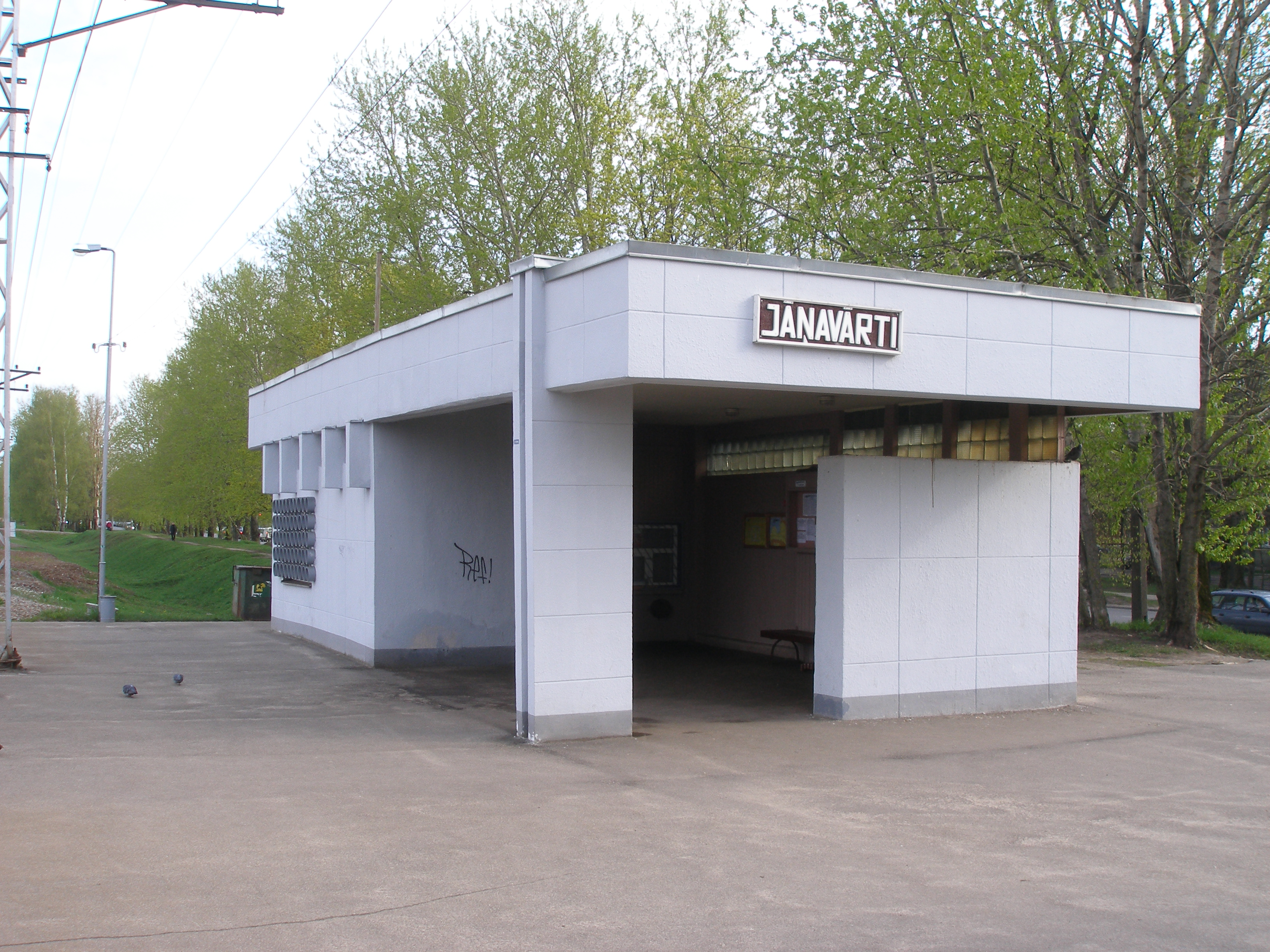
- Passenger building of the Jāņavārti Station

General information
- Location: Riga, Salaspils iela 18, LV-1057; Latvia
- Coordinates: 56°55′08″N 24°11′09″E
- Operator: Latvian Railways
- Line: Riga – Daugavpils
- Platforms: 3 (1 not used)
- Tracks: 18

History
- Opened: 1935

Services
Preceding station	LDz	Following station
Vagonu Parks towards Riga	Riga–Daugavpils	Daugmale towards Daugavpils
Location

Jāņavārti Station is a railway station on the Riga – Daugavpils Railway. The former Riga–Ērgļi Railway branched off from this station. Many service buildings are located in this station.

== History ==
Jāņavārti Station was opened in 1935 as a railway station for the Riga - Ērgļi Railway. Passenger trains of the Riga - Daugavpils Railway started in 1957. Near the station is a pedestrian bridge, which has been closed since 2003, because of its poor technical condition. The platform of the Riga - Ērgļi Railway has remained, although passenger trains have not run there since 2007. Currently all trains that are not 'Express' stop at the station.
