= Šķirotava Station =

Railway station in Riga, Latvia

Šķirotava
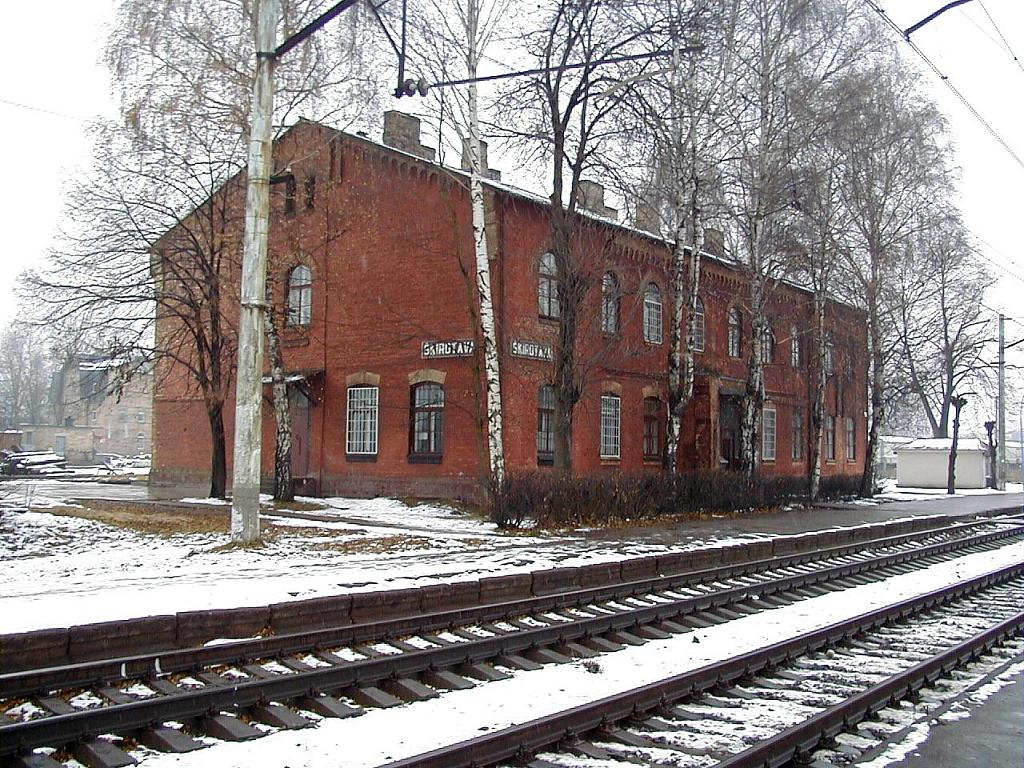
- Passenger building of Šķirotava railway station

General information
- Location: Lokomotīves iela 71, Riga; Latvia
- Coordinates: 56°54′17.78″N 24°12′39.34″E
- Line: Riga–Daugavpils Railway
- Platforms: 2

History
- Opened: 1905
- Former names: Platform No.8

Services
Preceding station	LDz	Following station
Daugmale towards Riga	Riga–Daugavpils	Gaisma towards Daugavpils
Location

Šķirotava Station is a railway station on the Riga–Daugavpils Railway.
