= Dabasu Durovys =

Latvian musical group

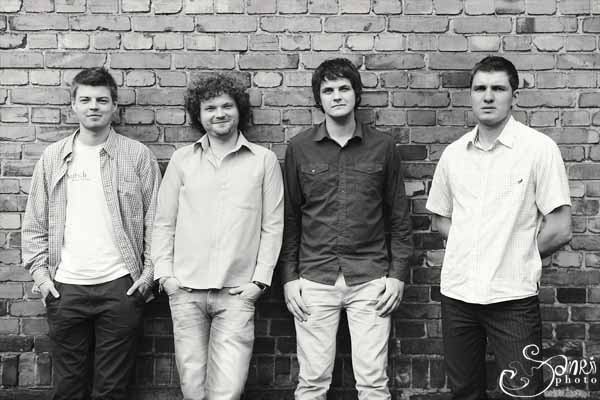

Background information
- Origin: Daugavpils, Latvia
- Genres: Pop rock Blues rock
- Years active: 2006–present
- Labels: Latgolys Producentu Grupa
- Members: Arnis Slobožaņins (lead vocals, guitar); Valdis Rundzāns (bass guitar); Romāns Sladzis (back vocals, electric guitar); Egils Kulmanis (Back Vocals, Saxophone); Aleksandrs Tamans (drums)
- Past members: Sergejs Čakāns; Edgars Kluss; Jānis Veliks; Mihails Šaiters; Kristaps Strods
- Website: draugiem.lv/dabasudurovys

Dabasu Durovys is a Latvian pop rock band, formed at the beginning of 2006 in Daugavpils. Most lyrics of their songs are written in Latgalian. The band's name is Latgalian for "the doors of the sky".

Dabasu Durovys is one of the first rock bands that started to write music in Latgalian, and it can be considered the member of the "Latgalian Music New Wave". The band has recorded the first ever Latgalian blues (Vipingys blūzs) and Dixieland (Vacais mašinists). The band has taken influences from the 60's pop and rock, folk rock, blues music and British pop rock.

In 2008, the band released their first music album Lepetnīks ('Butterfly'). Like many other new bands, Dabasu Durovys has taken part in many contests for young bands, with some success in 2007 (Mic Rec bārs Open) and 2010 (Četri balti krekli New Music Contest).The band has also participated in the notable Latvian music festival "Bildes". In 2012 their album Styklu Vītā Skaņa ('Sound instead of glass') was nominated as one of top 5 best pop rock albums of 2012 in the Annual Latvian Music Awards (Latvijas Mūzikas Gada Balva). Apart from playing more than 20 concerts a year, Dabasu Durovys has also participated in festivals abroad – Lithuania (2007, 2009, 2011, 2012), Portugal (2010), Australia (2011) and Poland (2015). In 2016, the band released their fourth album Pādys Runoj ('The Footprints Talk').

== Radio singles ==
Year	Single	Radio station	Album
2006	Čajs ar madu	Latgales Radio; Latvijas Radio 2 Radio SWH	Lepetnīks
2006	Vipingys Blūzs	Latgales Radio	Lepetnīks
2006	Bezprotā	Latgales Radio; Fit FM; Latvijas Radio 2	Lepetnīks
2008	Trejūs naktī	Latgales Radio; LTV program Sems	Lepetnīks
2008	Tai tam byus byut	Latgales Radio; Latvijas Radio 2 Kurzemes Radio	Styklu Vītā Skaņa
2009	Muoksleigi kameisi	Latgales Radio; Latvijas Radio 2 Radio Naba	Styklu Vītā Skaņa
2010	Lai jau kreit	Latgales Radio	Styklu Vītā Skaņa
2011	Grēku fani	Radio Valmiera; Latvijas Radio 1 Latvijas Radio 2 Latgales Radio; Latviešu Radio	Styklu Vītā Skaņa
2011	Trešais pagarinuojums	Latviešu Radio; Latgales Radio	Styklu Vītā Skaņa
2012	Pusnakts Triādis	Latgales Radio	Styklu Vītā Skaņa
2014	Sejas Grāmata	Muzikālā Banka	Bāka

== Discography ==
- Lepetnīks (2008)
- Styklu Vītā Skaņa (2012)
- Bāka (2014)
- Pādys Runoj (2016)
