= LTV7 =

Latvian national television channel

- Logo used since 2021
- Country: Latvia
- Broadcast area: Latvia
- Headquarters: Riga

Programming
- Language: Latvian
- Picture format: 1080i (HDTV)

Ownership
- Owner: LSM
- Sister channels: LTV1

History
- Launched: 1961; 65 years ago (Soviet relay); August 1991; 34 years ago (as LTV2)
- Former names: LTV2 (1991–2003)

Links
- Website: Official website

LTV7 is the second channel of Latvian Television (LTV), the state-owned public service television broadcaster in Latvia. The channel was launched during the Soviet occupation in 1961 and assumed its current form following Latvia's restoration of independence in 1991.

Until the 2003 rebrand of LTV, the channel was known as LTV2; it also served as the designated channel for Russian-language programming, with such content ending in 2025. Compared with LTV's flagship general-interest channel, LTV7 focused on sports coverage, documentaries, films, and lifestyle programming.

== History ==
Until the restoration of Latvian independence, LTV7 was primarily a relay of Soviet Central Television (while the first channel served as the republican service). Following the restoration of independence in August 1991, the channel became LTV2. In 1998, LTV2, along with all the other Latvian television channels, replaced SECAM with PAL.

In January 2003, coinciding with the corporate rebrand of Latvian Television, LTV2 was rebranded as LTV7. The "7" derived from the initial slogan of the renamed service, "Because every day is like a holiday", which was paired with a new programming concept, refreshed content, and higher advertising rates.

The Russophone morning show Utro-7 premiered on 30 August 2004. It was produced by Media Group Russian-Europe, with LTV providing technical assistance. The show featured Russian television celebrities as presenters: Vladimir Molchanov, Aleksandr Gordon, Ekaterina Gordon, Levon Oganezov, Pavel Kashin, and later Ksenia Strizh. The program ended on 28 January 2005, only a few months after its launch. According to LTV's directives, Utro-7 did not align with the channel's profile, and its ratings fell short of expectations, amid a broader viewership crisis at LTV at the time. On the following weekday (31 January), LTV7 started broadcasting from 7:30 am.

=== Removal of Russian-language programming ===
In June 2020, the head of National Electronic Mass Media Council (NEPLP) announced the cessation of Russian-language programming on LTV7, but the plan was reversed due to the absence of Russian-language news coverage until a dedicated news channel would be established. In September 2024, the Public Electronic and Mass Media Council (SEPLP) announced that, as part of a Latvian government policy to reduce the use of Russian in public life, LTV7 would cease broadcasting Russian-language programming from 1 January 2025 and become a fully Latvian-language channel, similar to sister channel LTV1. The last remaining Russian-language program is Tonight. LSM+News, thereafter, Russian-language content will be limited to online platforms, including the website and social media.

== Broadcasting ==
Terrestrial broadcasting is operated by the Latvian State Radio and Television Centre (LVRTC). LTV7 is a must-carry channel on cable and satellite platforms. In August 2007, the channel began satellite broadcasts covering the entire territory. On 1 March 2010, analog terrestrial broadcasting ended, and transmission became exclusively digital, using the DVB-T (MPEG-4) format. High-definition broadcasting began on 19 May 2021.

== Logos and identities ==
=== LTV2 ===
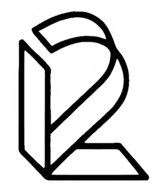
1991 to 1997

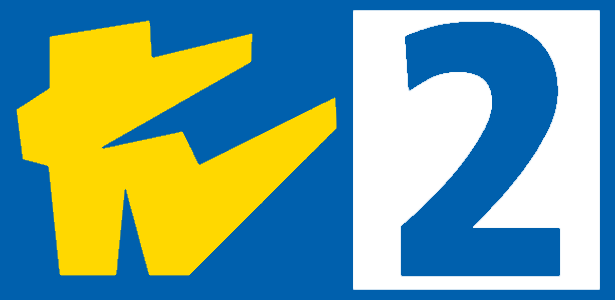
1997 to 2000

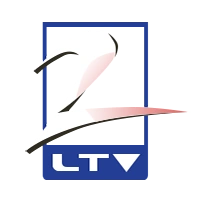
2000 to 2003

=== LTV7 ===
2003 to 2006

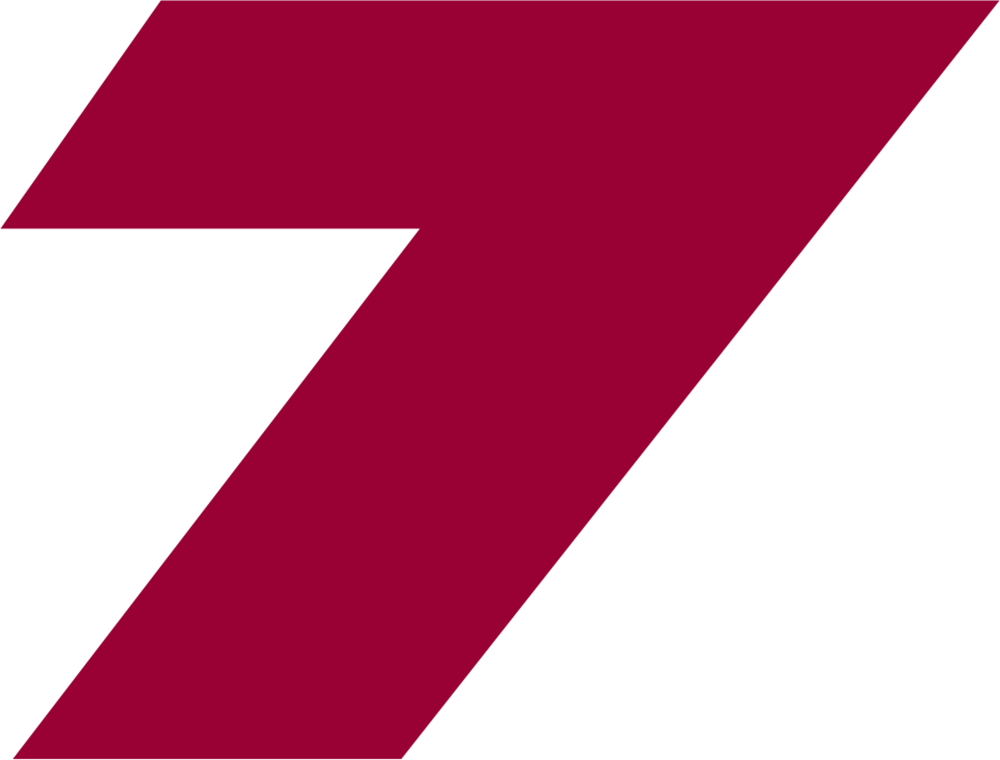
2006 to 2012

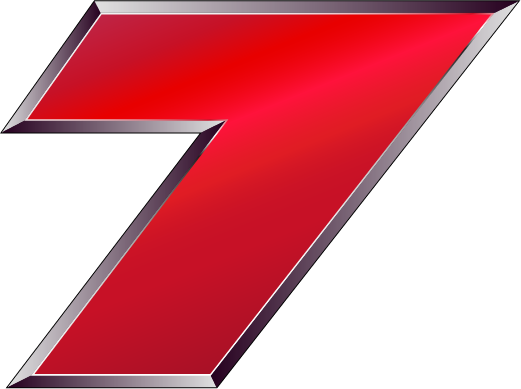
2012 to 2021

2021 to present
