= National Electronic Mass Media Council =

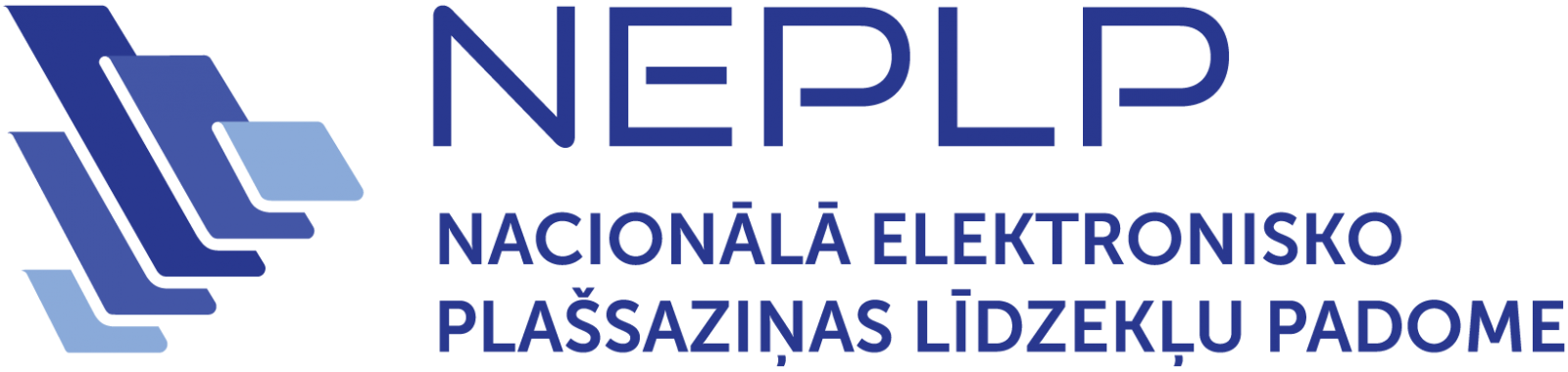
Official logo.

The National Electronic Media Council (Latvian: Nacionālā elektronisko plašsaziņas līdzekļu padome; abbreviated NEPLP) is an independent institution in the Republic of Latvia, charged with developing, supporting and monitoring the electronic media sector in Latvia.

Until 4 August 2021, the NEPLP performed the functions of the meeting of the state capital shareholders and members of the public broadcasting organizations Latvia Televīzija and Latvijas Radio. Following Russia's invasion of Ukraine in February 2022, Latvia took significant steps to block Russian media outlets.

== See also ==
- Canadian Radio-television and Telecommunications Commission
