= Latgalian language =

East Baltic language

Latgalian
- latgalīšu volūda
- Native to: Latvia, Russia
- Region: Latgalia, Selonia, Vidzeme, Siberia, Bashkortostan
- Ethnicity: Modern Latgalians
- Native speakers: 200,000 (2009)
- Language family: Indo-European: Balto-Slavic; Baltic; East Baltic; Latvian; High Latvian; Non-Selonic; Latgalian
- Early forms: Proto-Indo-European: Proto-Baltic
- Writing system: Latin (Latgalian alphabet)

Language codes
- ISO 639-3: ltg
- Glottolog: east2282
- Linguasphere: Latgale 54-AAB-ad Latgale
- Use of Latgalian in everyday communication in 2011 by municipalities of Latvia

- Latgalian is classified as Vulnerable by the UNESCO Atlas of the World's Languages in Danger.

Latgalian (latgalīšu volūda, Latvian: latgaliešu valoda) is an East Baltic language. The language law of Latvia classifies it as a "historical variant of the Latvian language". It is mostly spoken in Latgale, the eastern part of Latvia. The 2011 Latvian census established that 164,500 of Latvia's inhabitants, or 8.8% of the population, speak Latgalian daily. 97,600 of them lived in Latgale, 29,400 in Riga and 14,400 in the Riga Planning Region.

== History ==
Baltic tribes (approximately), c. 1200

Originally Latgalians were a tribe living in modern Vidzeme and Latgale. It is thought that they spoke the Latvian language, which later spread through the rest of modern Latvia, absorbing features of the Old Curonian, Semigallian, Selonian and Livonian languages. The Latgale area became politically separated during the Polish–Swedish wars, remaining part of the Polish–Lithuanian Commonwealth as the Inflanty Voivodeship, while the rest of the Latvians lived in lands dominated by Baltic German nobility. Both centuries of separate development and the influence of different prestige languages likely contributed to the development of modern Latgalian as distinct from the language spoken in Vidzeme and other parts of Latvia.

=== 18th–20th century ===
The modern Latgalian literary tradition started to develop in the 18th century from vernaculars spoken by Latvians in the eastern part of Latvia. The first surviving book published in Latgalian is Evangelia toto anno (Gospels for the whole year) in 1753. The first systems of orthography were borrowed from Polish and used Antiqua letters. It was very different from the German-influenced orthography, usually written in Blackletter or Gothic script, used for the Latvian language in the rest of Latvia. Many Latgalian books in the late 18th and early 19th century were authored by Jesuit priests, who came from various European countries to Latgale as the north-eastern outpost of the Roman Catholic religion; their writings included religious literature, calendars, and poetry.

Publishing books in the Latgalian language along with Lithuanian was forbidden from 1865 to 1904. The ban on using Latin letters in this part of the Russian Empire followed immediately after the January Uprising, where insurgents in Poland, Lithuania, and Latgale had challenged the rule of the Tsar. During the ban, only a limited number of smuggled Catholic religious texts and some hand-written literature were available, e.g. calendars written by the self-educated peasant Andryvs Jūrdžs.

After the repeal of the ban in 1904, there was a quick rebirth of the Latgalian literary tradition; first newspapers, textbooks, and grammar appeared. In 1918 Latgale became part of the newly created Latvian state. From 1920 to 1934 the two literary traditions of Latvians developed in parallel. A notable achievement during this period was the original translation of the New Testament into Latgalian by the priest and scholar Aloizijs Broks, published in Aglona in 1933. After the coup staged by Kārlis Ulmanis in 1934, Latgalian was downgraded from language to dialect, as a subject it was removed from the school curriculum and was invalidated for use in state institutions; this was as part of an effort to standardize Latvian language usage, however, usage of Latgalian was unofficially permitted. Latgalian survived as a spoken language in Soviet-occupied Latvia (1940–1990) while printed literature in Latgalian virtually ceased between 1959 and 1989. In emigration, some Latgalian intellectuals continued to publish books and studies of the Latgalian language, most notably Mikeļs Bukšs.

Since the restoration of Latvian independence in 1990, there has been a noticeable increase in interest in the Latgalian language and cultural heritage. It was once again taught as an optional subject in some universities; in Rēzekne the Publishing House of Latgalian Culture Centre (Latvian: Latgales kultūras centra izdevniecība) led by Jānis Elksnis, prints both old and new books in Latgalian.

In 1992, Juris Cibuļs together with Lidija Leikuma published one of the first Latgalian alphabet books after the restoration of the language.

=== 21st century ===
In the 21st century, the Latgalian language has become more visible in Latvia's cultural life. Apart from its preservation movements, Latgalian can be more often heard in different interviews on national TV channels such as LTV1 and regional channel ReTV (some of which are produced by the broadcasting company SIA Latgales reģionālā televīzija or LRT). Latvijas Radio, the national public radio broadcaster, offers an hour-long Latgolys stuņde (Latgale Hour) bulletin every Friday live from its Latgale studio on LR1. Additional digital content and articles in Latgalian are offered by its parent organization, LSM. The private station Latgales Radio (Latgolys Radeja) mostly broadcasts in Latgalian. Other publications include the digital magazine Latgalīšu Kulturys Gazeta (Latgalian Culture Gazette, lakuga.lv), a supplement of the regional newspaper Latgales Laiks called Latgalīšu Gazeta etc.

There are modern rock groups such as Borowa MC and Dabasu Durovys singing in Latgalian who have had moderate success also throughout the country. Today, Latgalian is also found in written form on public signs, such as some street names (e.g. in Kārsava) and shop signs, evidence of growing use in the linguistic landscape.

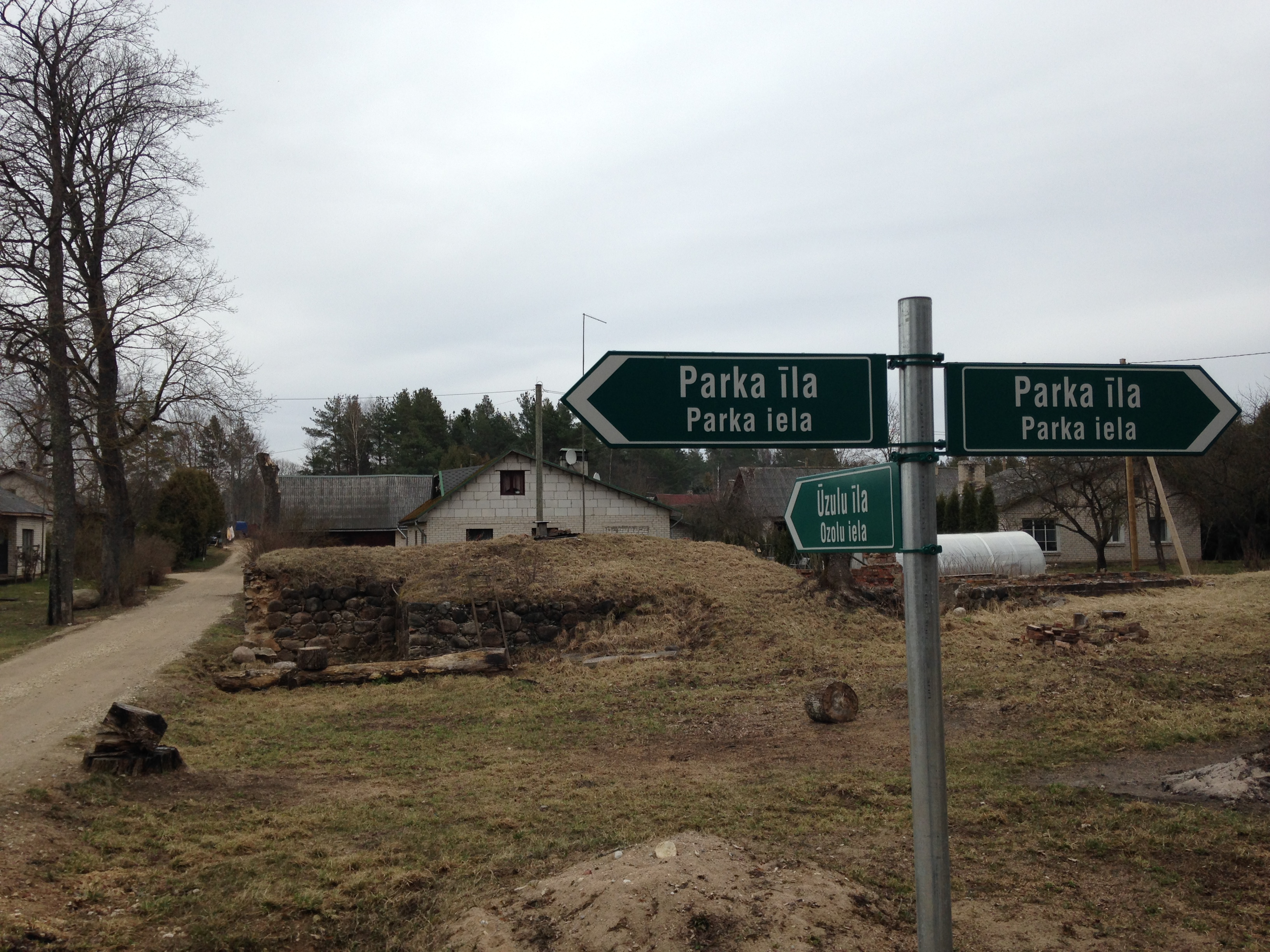
Bilingual direction signs in Latgalian and Latvian in Salnava Parish, Ludza Municipality, in 2016

In 2014, 105 bilingual street signs in Latvian and Latgalian were installed in Kārsava Municipality as part of a youth initiative enabled by the Latgale Culture Program. The Latvian State Language Center objected to the signs over the fact that they feature Latgalian more prominently than Latvian and asked for their removal, but no action was taken.

In November 2021, the first state-approved road sign in both Latvian and Latgalian was placed on the border of Balvi Municipality, with others being gradually installed in other locations in Latgale such as in Preiļi Municipality and in 2023 also in Rēzekne Municipality. The bilingual road signs gained a mixed reception with some seeing at as a pretext for dividing society or being upset that they were not informed about it beforehand and in Balvi Municipality the bilingual road signs have even become a target of vandalism with the Latgalian name being repeatedly painted over.

In 2022, Latvian President Egils Levits opened the annual Latgale Congress encouraging a wider use of spoken and written Latgalian, while reasserting that Latvian should remain the only official state language.

I believe that the Latgalian language must be present in Latgale, visualizing and marking the Latgalian cultural space, which is a special component of the Latvian cultural space. Therefore, the Latgalian language must become more visible and more widely used in Latgale and elsewhere in Latvia.

— President of Latvia Egils Levits, 28 April 2022

== Classification ==
Latgalian is a member of the East Baltic branch of the Baltic group of languages, in the family of Indo-European languages. The branch also includes Latvian and other Baltic languages like Samogitian and Lithuanian. All of the aforementioned languages have many similarities, but without experience of communication, speakers of other languages cannot mutually understand their spoken form, while there are many similarities in the written form. Latgalian is a moderately inflected language; the number of verb and noun forms is characteristic of many other Baltic and Slavic languages (see Inflection in Baltic Languages).

== Geographic distribution ==
Latgalian is spoken by about 150,000 people, mainly in Latgale, Latvia; there are small Latgalian-speaking communities in Siberia, Russia, created as a result of the emigration of Latgalians at the turn of the 19th and 20th centuries. and the Soviet deportations from Latvia.

== Official status ==
Between 1920 and 1934 Latgalian was used in local government and education in Latgale. Now Latgalian is not used as an official language anywhere in Latvia. It is formally protected by the Latvian Language Law stating that "The Latvian State ensures the preservation, protection, and development of the Latgalian literary language as a historical variant of the Latvian language" (§3.4). The law regards Latgalian and Standard Literary Latvian as two equal variants of the same Latvian language. Even though such legal status allows usage of Latgalian in state affairs and education spheres, it still happens quite rarely.

There is a state-supported orthography commission of the Latgalian language. Whether the Latgalian language is a separate language or a dialect of Latvian language was a matter of heated debate throughout the 20th century. Proponents of Latgalian such as linguists Antons Breidaks and Lidija Leikuma have suggested Latgalian has the characteristics of an independent language sitting between Latvian and Lithuanian with similarities in both.

== Dialects ==
Latgalian speakers can be classified into three main groups – Northern, Central, and Southern. These three groups of local accents are entirely mutually intelligible and characterized only by minor changes in vowels, diphthongs, and some inflexion endings. The regional accents of central Latgale (such as those spoken in the towns and rural municipalities of Juosmuiža, Vuorkova, Vydsmuiža, Viļāni, Sakstygols, Ūzulaine, Makašāni, Drycāni, Gaigalova, Bierži, Tiļža, and Nautrāni) form the phonetical basis of the modern standard Latgalian language. The literature of the 18th century was more influenced by the Southern accents of Latgalian.

== Phonology ==
Vowel phonemes of Latgalian
| | Front | | Central | | Back | |
| | short | long | short | long | short | long |
|---|---|---|---|---|---|---|
| Close | i ⟨i⟩ | iː ⟨ī⟩ | (ɨ) ⟨y⟩ | | u ⟨u⟩ | uː ⟨ū⟩ |
| Mid | ɛ ⟨e⟩ | (ɛː) ⟨ē⟩ | | | ɔ ⟨o⟩ | (ɔː) ⟨ō⟩ |
| Open | æ ⟨e⟩ | æː ⟨ē⟩ | a ⟨a⟩ | aː ⟨ā⟩ | | |
| Diphthongs | iɛ uɔ | | | | | |

- [ɨ] occurs in complementary distribution with [i], so that they can be regarded as allophones of a single /i/ phoneme.
- Long /ɛː, ɔː/ are rare and occur only in interjections. The phonological long counterparts of the short /ɛ, ɔ/ are the diphthongs /iɛ, uɔ/.
- There are very few minimal pairs for the /ɛ–æ/ opposition. In some dialects, [æ] is simply an allophone of /ɛ/.
- /a, aː/ are phonetically central [ä, äː].
- Apart from [iɛ] and [uɔ], there are also vowel+glide sequences [ɛi̯, æi̯, ai̯, iu̯, ɨu̯, au̯], which are very common. Rarer sequences include [ui̯], [ɔi̯] and [ɔu̯], with the last one occurring only in onomatopoeias and loanwords. Phonemically, they are all sequences of two phonemes, rather than proper diphthongs. In some dialects, [iu̯] and [ɨu̯] fall together as [ɛu̯]. [au̯] can also merge with [ɔu̯] as [ɔu̯].

Consonant phonemes of Latgalian
| | | Labial (Note: /m, mʲ, p, pʲ, b, bʲ/ are bilabial, whereas /f, v, vʲ/ are labiodental.) | | Dental/ Alveolar | | Postalveolar/ Palatal | | Velar | |
| | | hard | soft | hard | soft | hard | soft (Note: The alveolo-palatals occur only in some non-standard dialects, with the fricatives /ɕ, ʑ/ being more common than the affricates /t͡ɕ, d͡ʑ/.) | hard | soft |
|---|---|---|---|---|---|---|---|---|---|
| Nasal | | m | mʲ | n | nʲ | | | | |
| Stop | voiceless | p | pʲ | t | tʲ | | | k | kʲ |
| Stop | voiced | b | bʲ | d | dʲ | | | ɡ | ɡʲ |
| Affricate | voiceless | | | t͡s | t͡sʲ | t͡ʃ | (t͡ɕ) | | |
| Affricate | voiced | | | d͡z | d͡zʲ | d͡ʒ | (d͡ʑ) | | |
| Fricative | voiceless | (f) (Note: /f/ occurs only in some loanwords, such as ortografeja transl. orthography. In other loanwords, it is replaced by /p/, as in kopejs transl. coffee.) | | s | sʲ | ʃ | (ɕ) | (x) (Note: /x/ occurs only in some loanwords, such as tehnologeja transl. technology. In other loanwords, it is replaced by /k/, as in kokejs transl. hockey.) | |
| Fricative | voiced | v (Note: /v, vʲ/ are traditionally classified as approximants [ʋ, ʋʲ] which phonetically may be fricatives [v, vʲ].) | vʲ | z | zʲ | ʒ | (ʑ) | | |
| Approximant | | v | vʲ | l | lʲ | ɪ̯ | (i̯) (Note: For the approximants /ɪ̯/ and /ʊ̯/ the contrast between their hard and soft versions is phonetically realized as a contrast between retraction and advancement. The "soft" counterparts of /ɪ̯/ and /ʊ̯/ are /i̯/ and /u̯/. Brejdak (2006, pp. 198–199) considers those to have phonemic status and argues that the contrast between them and the plain /ɪ̯/ and /ʊ̯/ corresponds to the soft/hard contrast. However, Nau (2011, p. 13) considers the phonemic status of /u̯/ and especially /i̯/ (which he transcribes with a non-IPA symbol ⟨jʲ⟩) as questionable. If the difference is considered to be allophonic, the resulting single palatal approximant can be transcribed with ⟨j⟩ and the corresponding labio-velar with ⟨w⟩. In this article, the difference is assumed to be phonemic.) | ʊ̯ (Note: /ʊ̯, u̯/ are labial-velar.) | (u̯) |
| Trill | | | | r | (rʲ) | | | | |

== Alphabet ==
The Latgalian language uses an alphabet with 35 letters. It is the same as the Latvian alphabet, but has two additional letters: ⟨y⟩ represents [ɨ]), an allophone of /i/ which is absent in standard Latvian. The letter ⟨ō⟩ survives from the pre-1947 Latvian orthography, but is used less during modern times in Latgalian and is being replaced by two letters ⟨uo⟩ that represent the same sound; the letter ⟨ō⟩ is more likely used in loanwords.

Alphabet
| Upper case | Lower case | Pronunciation |
|---|---|---|
| A | a | /a/ |
| Ā | ā | /aː/ |
| B | b | /b/ |
| C | c | /t͡s/ |
| Č | č | /t͡ʃ/ |
| D | d | /d/ |
| E | e | /ɛ/ |
| Ē | ē | /ɛː/ |
| F | f | /f/ |
| G | g | /ɡ/ |
| Ģ | ģ | /ɡʲ/ |
| H | h | /x/ |
| I | i | /i/ |
| Y | y | /ɨ/ |
| Ī | ī | /iː/ |
| J | j | /j/ |
| K | k | /k/ |
| Ķ | ķ | /kʲ/ |
| L | l | /l/ |
| Ļ | ļ | /lʲ/ |
| M | m | /m/ |
| N | n | /n/ |
| Ņ | ņ | /nʲ/ |
| O | o | /ɔ/ |
| Ō | ō | /ɔː/ |
| P | p | /p/ |
| R | r | /r/ |
| S | s | /s/ |
| Š | š | /ʃ/ |
| T | t | /t/ |
| U | u | /u/ |
| Ū | ū | /uː/ |
| V | v | /v/ |
| Z | z | /z/ |
| Ž | ž | /ʒ/ |

The IETF language tags have registered subtags for the 1929 orthography (ltg-ltg1929) and the 2007 orthography (ltg-ltg2007).

== See also ==
- Latgalian Wikipedia
- Samogitian language
- Võro language
- Livonian language

== Sources ==
- Nau, Nicole (2011). A short grammar of Latgalian. Munich: Lincom Europa. ISBN 978-3-86288-055-3.
