= LTV1 =

- Logo used since 2022
- Country: Latvia
- Broadcast area: Latvia
- Headquarters: Riga, Latvia

Programming
- Language: Latvian
- Picture format: 1080i (HDTV)

Ownership
- Owner: LSM
- Sister channels: LTV7

History
- Launched: November 6, 1954; 71 years ago

Links
- Website: Official website

LTV1 (Latvian: Latvijas Televīzija 1) is the first television channel of Latvijas Televīzija (LTV), the state-owned public service television broadcaster in Latvia. The channel offers news, analysis, talk shows, interviews, documentaries, feature films, TV series, cultural programs, theatre performances, concerts, sports coverage, quiz shows, music programs, and entertainment shows. From 2021 to 2025, LTV1 was the country's most watched channel.

== History ==
LTV made its first test broadcasts on 6 November 1954 from a studio in Soviet Riga in black-and-white, which were seen by the 20 owners of personal television sets. This made LTV the first and oldest national television station in the Baltics. Regular broadcasting started on 20 November 1954. Initially, LTV did not have rights to create programming, except live shows. In 1955, the Riga Television studio in Nometņu iela, Āgenskalns was created to produce programming and the first TV tower in Latvia was built. As of 1960, LTV aired 1,300 hours a year. The channel aired news bulletins every day except on Sundays, while its broadcasts were praised for their sophistication.

For its 50th anniversary on 5-6 November 2004, LTV1 aired special programming. Shortly after these celebrations, LTV announced the creation of a new look, which was to be designed externally, to attract the age 15–45 demographic..

The channel planned to remove cultural programming in October 2006, justifying the move by the creation of a third channel.

On 15 January 2013, the channel started broadcasting in 16:9 widescreen. LTV1 changed its logo in September 2013, thickening the extant logo, as an act to improve relations with LTV7.

LTV1 was the most-watched television channel in Latvia in 2021 with 11.4% of total viewing time, according to a Kantar survey.

== Logos and identities ==
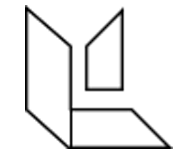
1991 to 1997

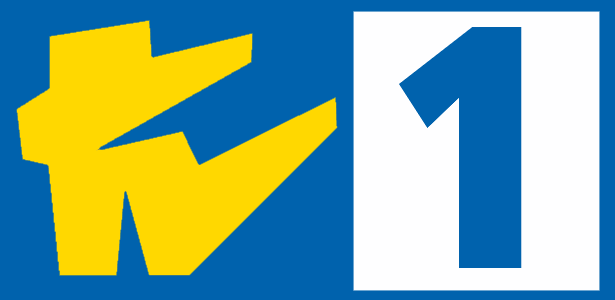
1997 to 2000

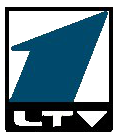
2000 to 2002

2003 to 2006

2006 to 2013

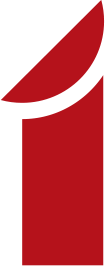
2013 to 2017

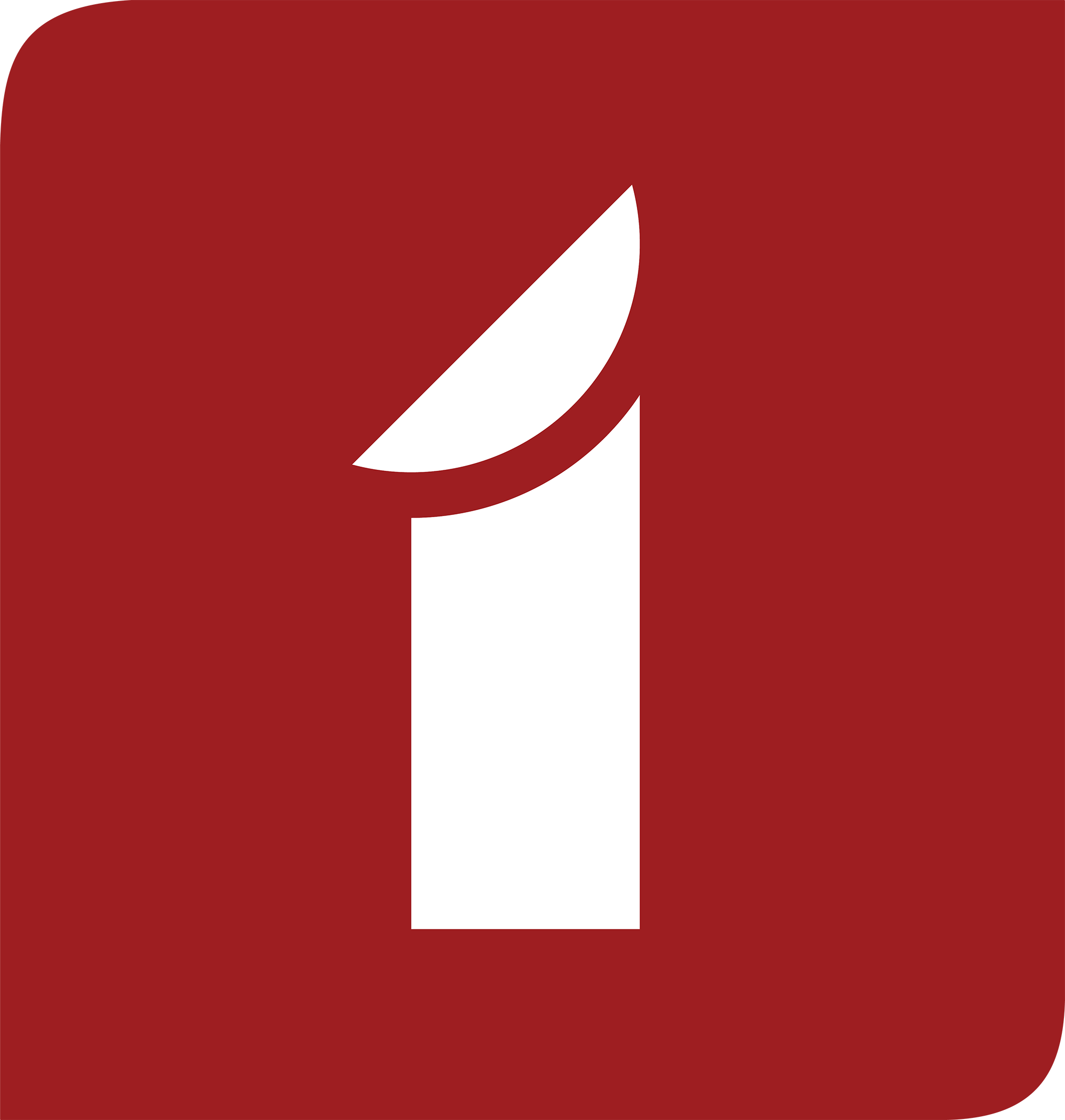
2017 to 2022

2022 to present
