= Latgales Laiks =

Latvian newspaper

- Type: Weekly newspaper
- Publisher: SIA Latgales Laiks
- Editor: Jeļena Bobkova
- Founded: May 23, 1992; 34 years ago
- Language: Latvian, Russian (supplements in Latgalian)
- Headquarters: Saules iela 71b, Daugavpils, Latvia
- Website: latgaleslaiks.lv

Latgales Laiks ('Latgale Times') is a regional newspaper published in Latvia, mainly distributed in its easternmost region, Latgale and Selonia. It was launched in May 1992 and is published once a week on Thursdays. A Russian-language version of the paper (Латгалес Лайкс) is also issued separately, and a Latgalian supplement called Latgalīšu Gazeta (Latgalian Gazette) has been issued since at least 2019.

Latgales Laiks focuses on the activities of Latgale inhabitants in different fields, devoting pages for coverage of sport events and interviews with athletes; important is reflection of Latgalian success in the world. The paper personifies regional identity-building features, coming closer to the work of style of the national newspapers.
