= Juris Cibuļs =

Latvian writer

Juris Cibuļs (Latgalian: Jurs Cybuļs, born December 6, 1951, in Rekova) is a Latvian publicist, humanist, linguist and translator.

== Early life and education ==
Juris Cibuļs was born in Rekova, Latvian SSR. He studied at the University of Latvia.

== Organizations ==
In 1978 Cibuļs was a member of the National Geographic Society. From 1989 to 1992 he was a member of the Council of People's Deputies in Balvi district. In 1995 he was a member of Maledicta and Amici Linguarum.

== Career ==
From 1985 to 1990 Cibuļs was a reporter of Skolotāju Avīze (Teacher's Newspaper).

From 1989 to 1990 he was deputy head of the local unit of the Popular Front of Latvia in Balvi district.

In 1990 he was MP in the Supreme Council of the Latvian Soviet Socialist Republic.

In 1994 Cibuļs was appointed to as a coordinator of the Department of Foreign Affairs in the Naturalization Office of the Republic of Latvia.

== Books ==
In 1992 he published a Latgalian alphabet book together with Lideja Leikuma.

In 2003 he wrote the book Vasals! on the grammar of the Latgalian Language.

== Collection ==
Cibuļs collects alphabet books in different languages. Currently there are 8000 from 210 countries in 970 languages and dialects. His collection has been presented in more than 170 exhibitions and museums.

== National Honours ==
- Order of the Three Stars (2000)
- Commemorative Medal for Participants of the Barricades of 1991

== Bibliography ==
- Latgalīšu ābece (lementars): eksper. māc. grām. divās daļās / Jurs Cybuļs, Lideja Leikuma. — Lielvārde: Lielvārds (1992)
- Īdzer veina, lai dzeive ira feina! / Jurs Cybuļs, Juons Ločmeļs. — R.: b.i. (1999)
- Vasals! Latgaliešu valodas mācība / J. Cibuļs, L. Leikuma. — R.: N.I.M.S. (2003)
- Brīnumainā valodu pasaule. B.v.: Raudava (2004)
- Latgaliešu ābeces (1768—2008). R.: Zinātne (2009)
