= Latvian Public Service Media =

Latvian government radio and TV

- Type: Public service broadcasting and news portal
- Industry: Mass media
- Founded: 3 February 2013; 13 years ago (as a portal); 2 January 2025; 19 months ago (as a company)
- Headquarters: Doma laukums 8, Riga, Latvia
- Area served: International (primarily Latvia)
- Key people: Baiba Zūzena (Chairman of the Board)
- Products: Broadcasting; Radio; Web portals
- Services: Television; Radio
- Owner: Government of Latvia
- Website: http://www.lsm.lv/ http://info.lsm.lv/

Latvian Public Service Media (Latvian: Latvijas Sabiedriskais medijs – LSM) is a publicly funded radio and television organization operated by both of Latvia's public broadcasters – Latvian Television and Radio Latvia. LSM provides news, analysis, culture, entertainment and new experimental content, produced mainly by Latvian Television and Radio Latvia, and by the portal's editorial personnel. The site was launched on 3 February 2013.

LSM content is also available in Latgalian, Russian, English, Ukrainian, and was previously also available in Belarusian and Polish. News content in English was made available from 1 July 2014.

A unified news portal was one of the steps planned in a much wider convergence of both public broadcasters. In 2012, Latvia's National Electronic Media Council (NEMC or NEPLP) approved the concept of creating a new Latvian public service media organization.

NEMC members had to decide from 3 different scenarios:

- partial convergence (institutional independence, but both media to engage in joint projects);
- full convergence with a single board and management;
- new single, minimal media (new structure itself would only produce news and current affairs programmes).

NEMC chose the second proposal, and approved its realization, including a unified internet platform as a new Latvian public service media, on 7 January 2013.

== History ==
LSM.lv in its first year showed rapid growth. According to Google Analytics, the news portal reached 200,000 – 250,000 page views per month, at the end of 2013 page view statistics doubled. In the first year of activity LSM has explored the role and importance of social media in order to reach audiences and bring them to the news portal.

According to an article, published on 3 February 2014, during first month 60% of all links to the site were from social networks such as Facebook, Twitter and draugiem.lv. In fact, statistics shows decrease in audience numbers brought by social media after first month of increased interest. And as well a lack of activities on social media platforms such as Facebook. The peak of page views in November 2013 is objective possibly due to the increased interest in the site following the Zolitūde shopping centre roof collapse.

In its second year of activity the portal was ranked among the 10 most popular sites in Latvia by Reach. By February 2015 lsm.lv reached 16.92% of the audience according to "Gemius" data. That placed the unified news portal 10th – its highest ranking so far. The increase in ranking can be explained by a lessening of fragmentation of the public broadcasters presence online.

Until the end of 2014 Latvian Television and Radio Latvia operated separate domains – ltv.lv and latvijasradio.lv. In order to strengthen the position of Latvian Public Service Media among other internet resources in Latvia, they both became sub-domains under lsm.lv as ltv.lsm.lv and latvijasradio.lsm.lv respectively.

After upgrading their broadcasting technology, both TV channels and content on the REplay.lv VOD service and LSM began a gradual switch to Full HD (1080p) from SDTV on 19 May 2021 for cable and online broadcasts (the switch for free terrestrial operators is scheduled for 2022). The LTV News Service programs (Panorāma etc.) marked their switch to 1080p on 30 August by unveiling a new studio and visuals.

On 12 August 2024, Latvian Public Service Media launched LSM+ for public media content in languages other than Latvian (and Latgalian), with content in English, Russian, Ukrainian, Belarusian, and Polish.

From 2 January 2025, LSM became a single company after the official full merger of LTV and LR.

== Logos ==
Initial LSM logo, 2012–2021

LSM logo, 2021–2025

LSM English service logo, 2021–2025

LSM Russian service logo, 2021–2025

== See also ==
- Latvijas Televīzija
- Latvijas Radio
