= Latvijas Radio =

National public-service radio network in Latvia

Coordinates: 56°57′00″N 24°06′21″E

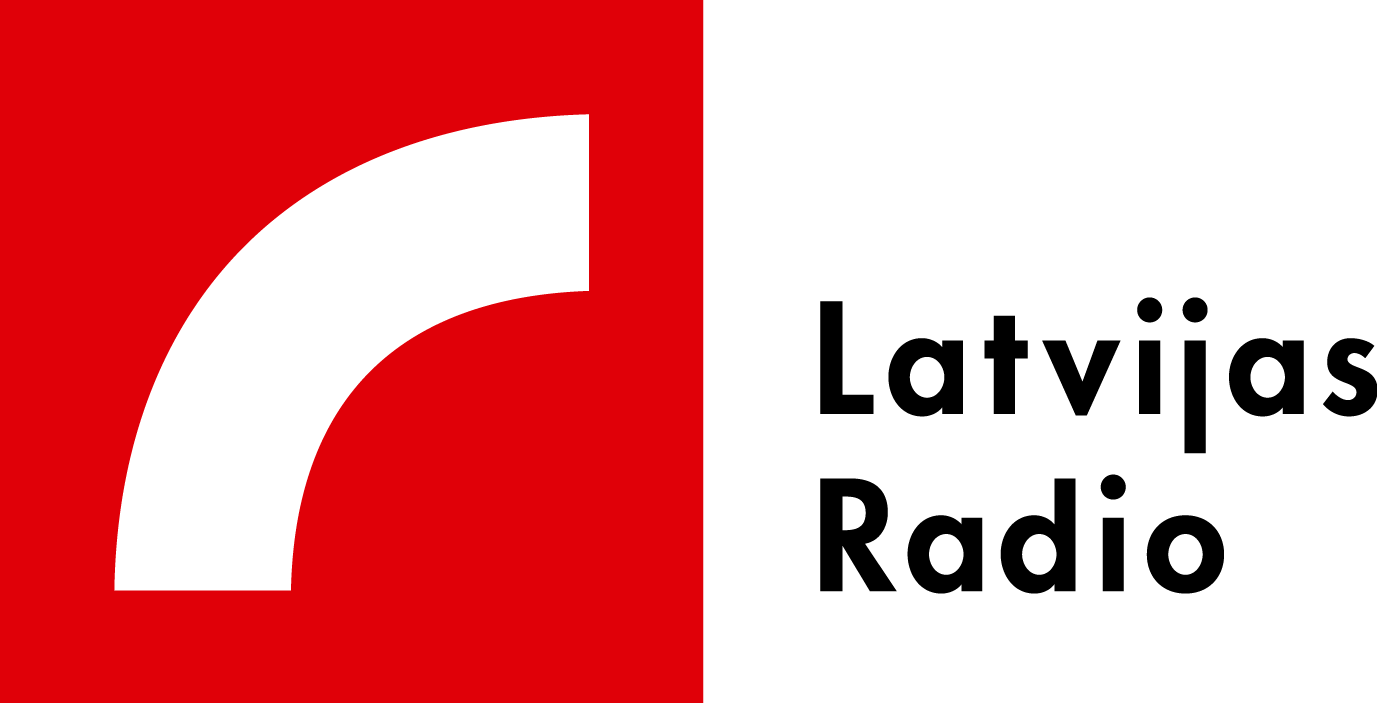

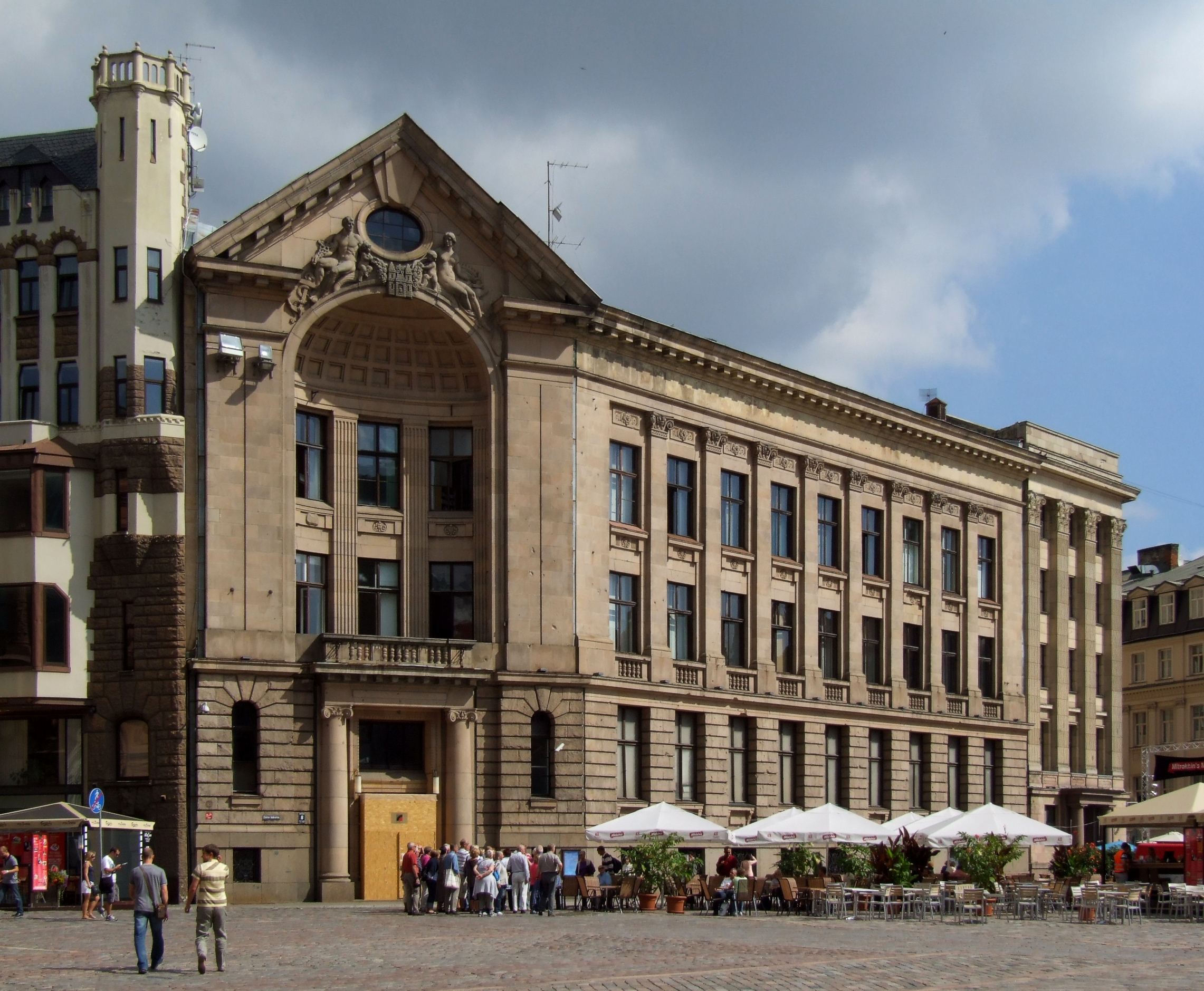
- The Latvijas Radio building in Riga's Cathedral Square
- Type: Public-service sound broadcasting
- Country: Latvia
- Broadcast area: Latvia (nationwide)

Ownership
- Owner: LSM

History
- Launch date: 1 November 1925; 100 years ago

Links
- Website: latvijasradio.lsm.lv/

Latvijas Radio (shortened LR; literally "Latvia's Radio") is Latvia's national public-service radio broadcasting network. It began broadcasting on 1 November 1925, and has its headquarters in the Latvian capital, Riga. Latvijas Radio broadcasts six different channels in the FM band as well as via the internet: Latvijas Radio 1, Latvijas Radio 2, Latvijas Radio 3 – Klasika, Latvijas Radio 4 – Doma laukums (till 2025), Latvijas Radio 5 – Pieci.lv, and Latvijas Radio 6 – Radio NABA.

== History ==
Latvijas Radio is a national cultural institution, fostering radio drama, and organizing a radio choir as well as children's vocal groups. The organization's phonographic archives contain approximately 200,000 sound recordings. Latvijas Radio became a member of the European Broadcasting Union (EBU) on 1 January 1993. From the restoration of Latvia's independence in 1991 to 31 December 1992, it was a member of the International Radio and Television Organisation (OIRT).

Since 2013, it has collaborated with Latvijas Televīzija (Latvian Television) as part of the Public Broadcasting of Latvia news platform and online streaming service. The broadcaster has been fully funded by the state budget since 1 January 2021, when, after years of debate, it and television broadcaster Latvijas Televīzija exited the advertising market. The merger of LTV and Latvian Radio into LSM was completed on 2 January 2025.

Latvijas Radio (as Radio Riga) also broadcast programming in Swedish from 1960 to 1995.

== Radio stations ==
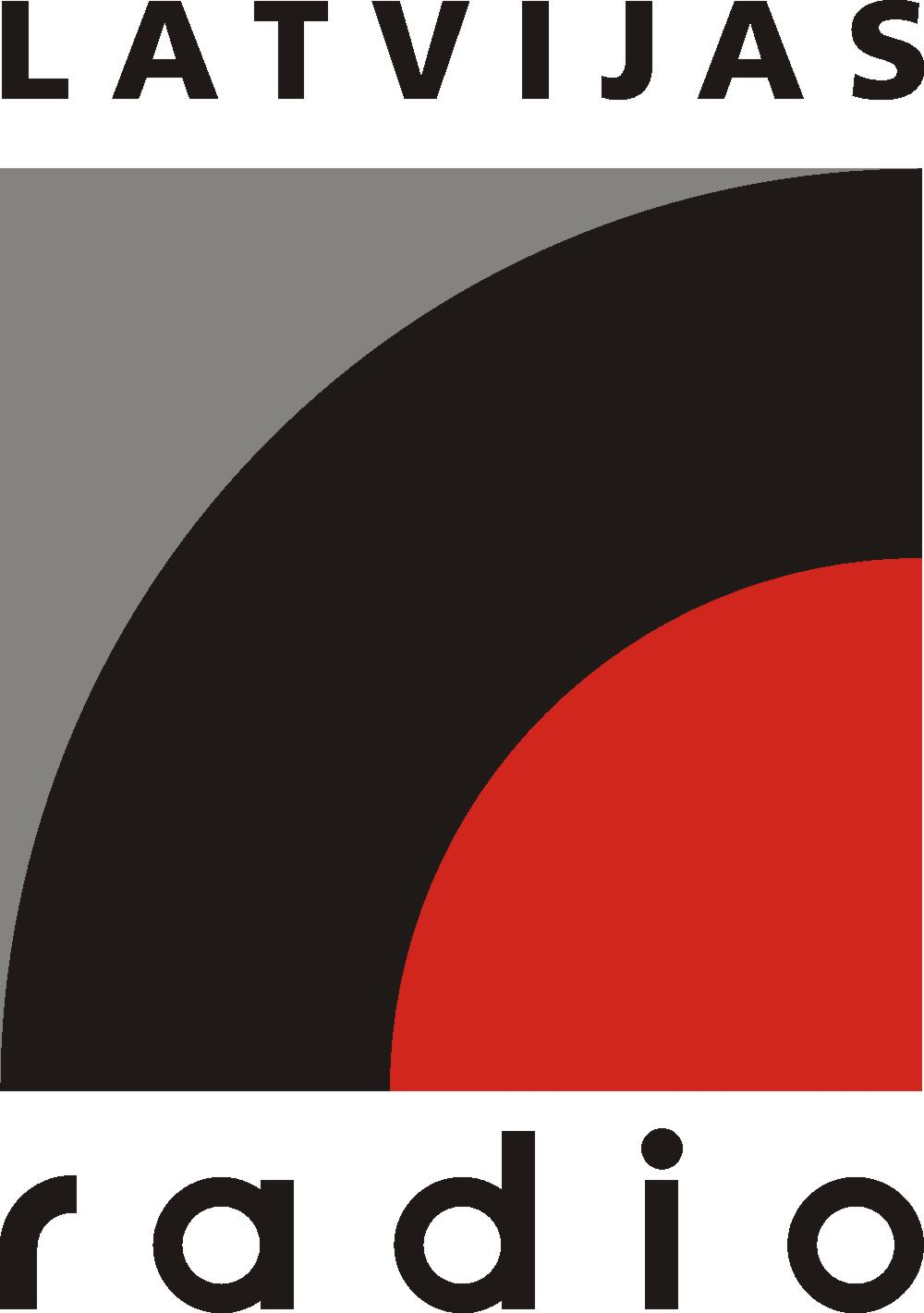
Latvian Radio logo, which was used from 2001 until 2015

=== Currently ===
==== Latvijas Radio 1 (LR1) ====
Latvijas Radio 1 is Latvia's main generalist national radio station, presenting news, talk and current affairs programming, as well as analysis of economics, Latvian politics and culture, and programmes for children.

The first program of Latvijas Radio, which was called the Riga Radiophone (lat. Rīgas radiofons) began broadcasting on 1 November 1925 from Radio iela in Riga, with Madama Butterfly as one of its first broadcasts. The station kept broadcasting during the Soviet occupation and German occupation of Latvia, becoming propaganda mouthpieces for each respective government. In December 1946, under the second Soviet occupation, the station began broadcasting from Dome Square.

The station broadcasts entirely in Latvian, except for select programs in Latgalian from its Latgale studio in Rēzekne.

Slogan:

Before 1 November 2006: Līderis informācijā ("Leader in information")

After 1 November 2006: Vienmēr pirmais. ("Always first.")

==== Latvijas Radio 2 (LR2) ====
Latvijas Radio 2, originally conceived as a youth station, today specializes in the broadcasting of Latvian-language pop and country music.

Slogan: Dziesmas dzimtajā valodā ("Songs in our native language")

==== Latvijas Radio 3 – Klasika (LR3) ====
Launched on 6 January 1996, Latvijas Radio 3 is the only station in Latvia broadcasting classical music and jazz.

Latvijas Radio's membership of the European Broadcasting Union (EBU) guarantees that the station's output includes relays of international concerts and other live broadcasts.

Slogan: Mode mainās – klasika paliek ("Trends change, but the classics remain").

==== Latvijas Radio 5 – pieci.lv (LR5) ====
Latvijas Radio 5 (branded as "pieci" on air - literally "five" in Latvian) is Latvijas Radio's newest station, playing youth-oriented music from Latvia and other countries. The station was first launched online on 14 July 2013, before launching on FM on 31 March 2014, taking over Radio Naba's (now Latvijas Radio 6) frequencies, despite Radio Naba programms still being broadcast during the night.

Slogan:

From 2013 to 2023: Uzgriez un ir! ("Tune in and that's it!").

From 2023 onwards: Klausies jauno! ("Listen to the new!").

==== Latvijas Radio 6 - Radio NABA (LR6) ====
Latvijas Radio 6, or Radio Naba, is a free-format radio station produced in association with the University of Latvia.

Radio NABA was launched on 1 December 2002 on 96,2 MHz with the support from the University of Latvia, its student council, and Latvijas Radio as Latvijas Radio 5, which was only heard in the capital. On 1 January 2006, Radio Naba moved its frequency to 93,1 MHz.

When the current Latvijas Radio 5 (pieci.lv) began broadcasting linearily in March 2014, some programs from Radio NABA continued to broadcast on Latvijas Radio 5, before moving to 95,8 MHz and rebranding as Latvijas Radio 6 in February 2015.

Some of its programs, like #DigitālāsBrokastis, can be heard on Latvijas Radio 1.

=== Former stations ===
==== Latvijas Radio 4 (LR4) ====
Launched on 7 January 2002, Latvijas Radio 4 (rus. Латвийское радио 4), nicknamed "Doma Square" (lat. Doma laukums, rus. Домская площадь), was the only Latvian public service station to broadcast in Russian, serving the country's Russian-language minority. It also offered programming from other European and international media's Russian language services, including RFE/RL and the BBC.

On 15 July 2025, seven months after the merger of Latvijas Radio and Latvijas Televīzija into LSM, the board of LSM set forward a strategy for the next 4 years, which includes moving foreign language broadcasting online, directly affecting Latvijas Radio 4. Despite petitions to revive and not close the network, Latvijas Radio 4 ceased broadcasting on 1 January 2026, right after the national anthem. Latvijas Radio 1's Latgalian program replaced its frequencies in eastern Latvia and Latvijas Radio 5 replaced its frequency in Liepāja, whilst its frequencies in Riga and Ventspils ceased broadcasting entirely.

Slogan: Это ваше пространство и ваше время. ("It's your space and your time.")

=== Station logos ===
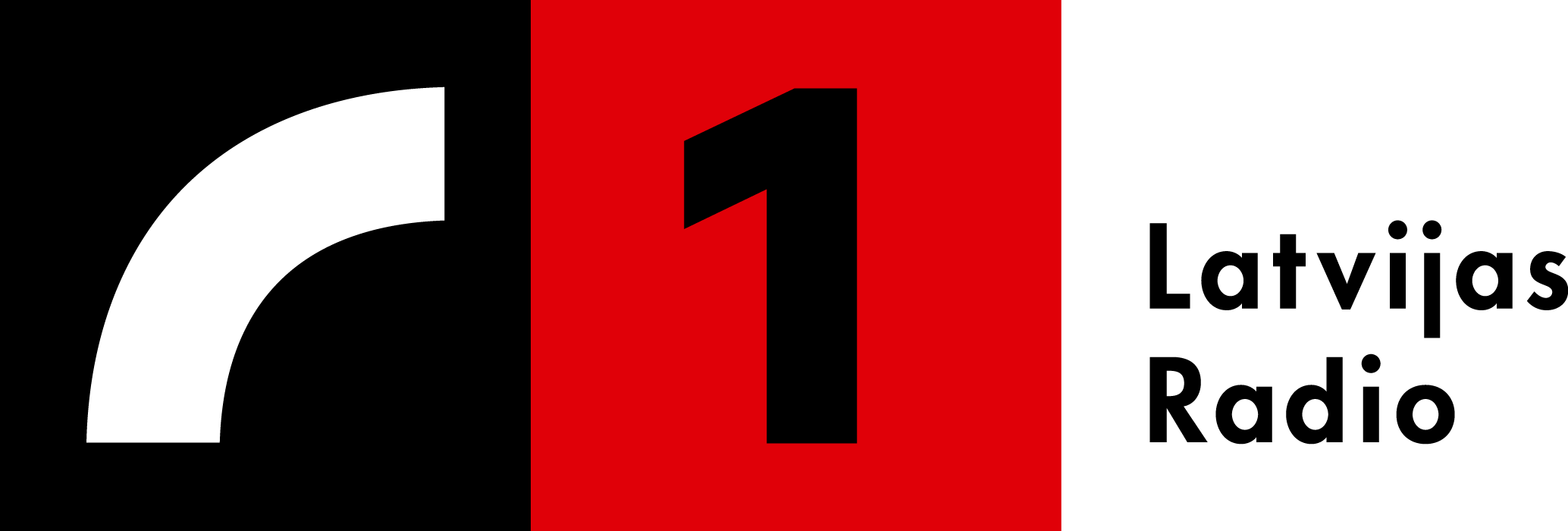
Latvijas Radio 1

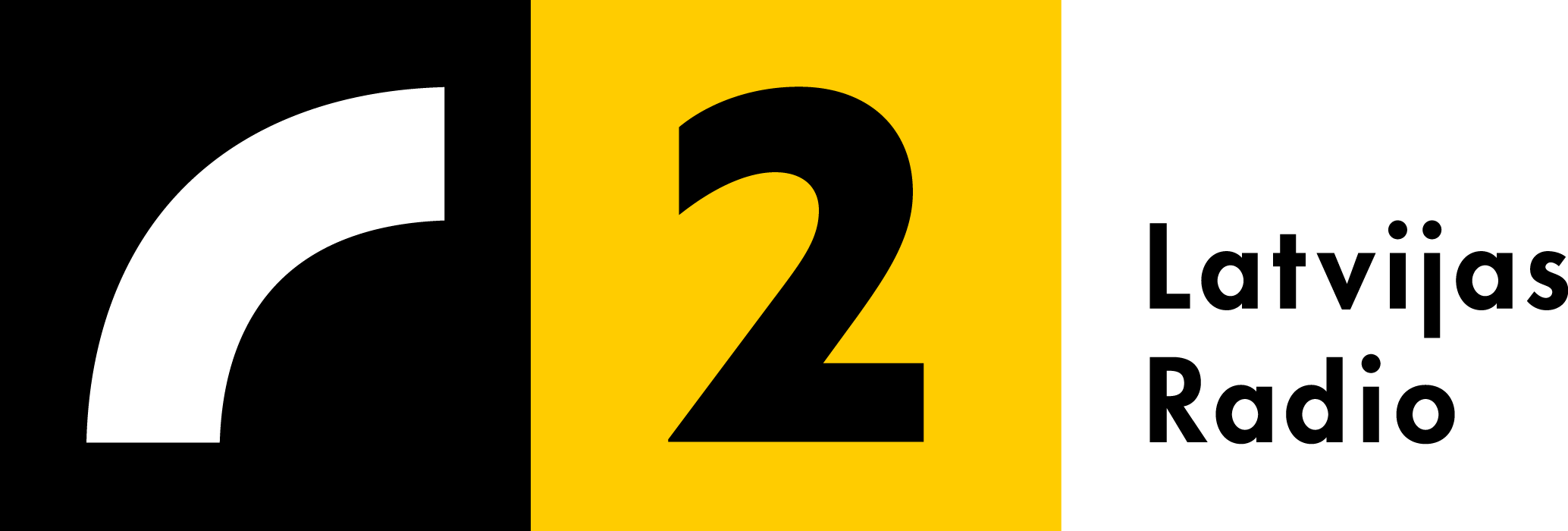
Latvijas Radio 2

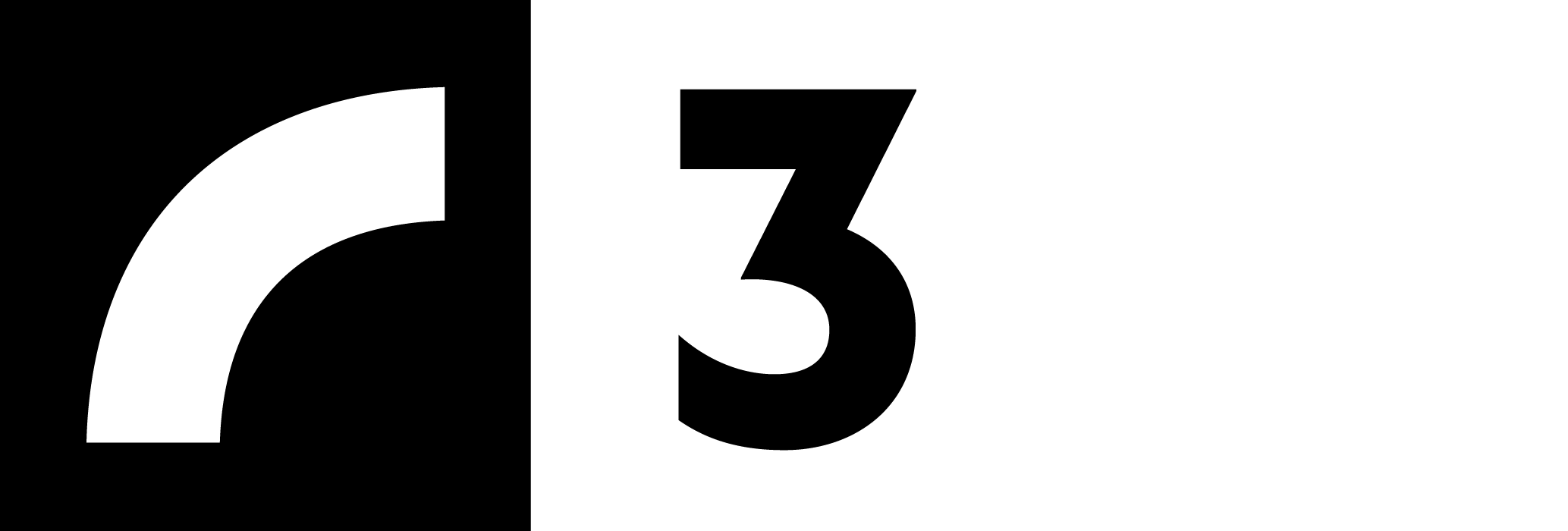
Latvijas Radio 3 – Klasika

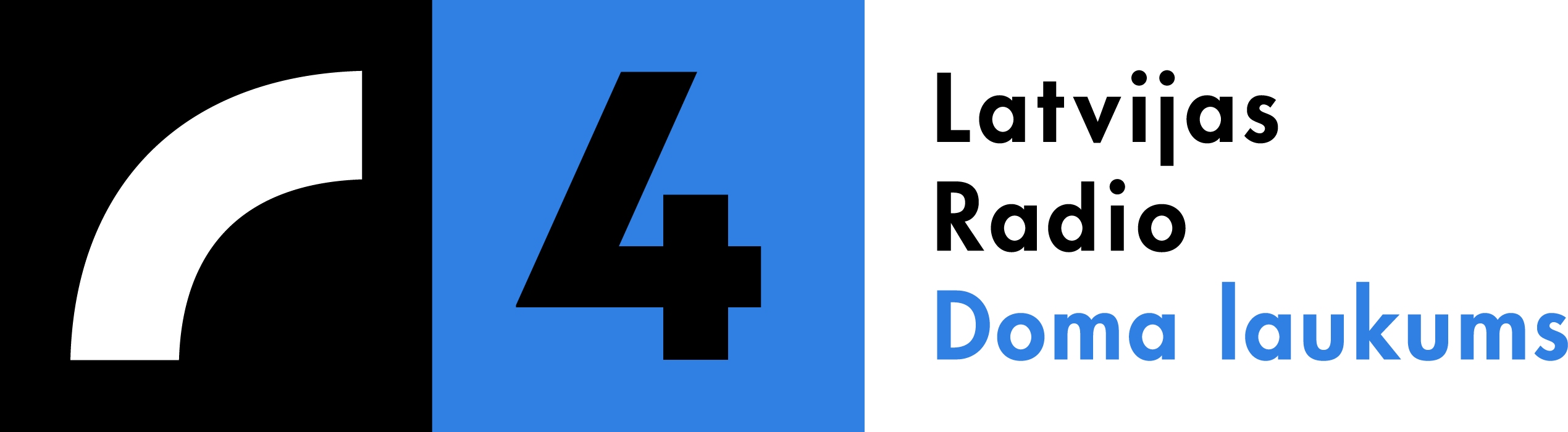
Latvijas Radio 4 – Doma laukums

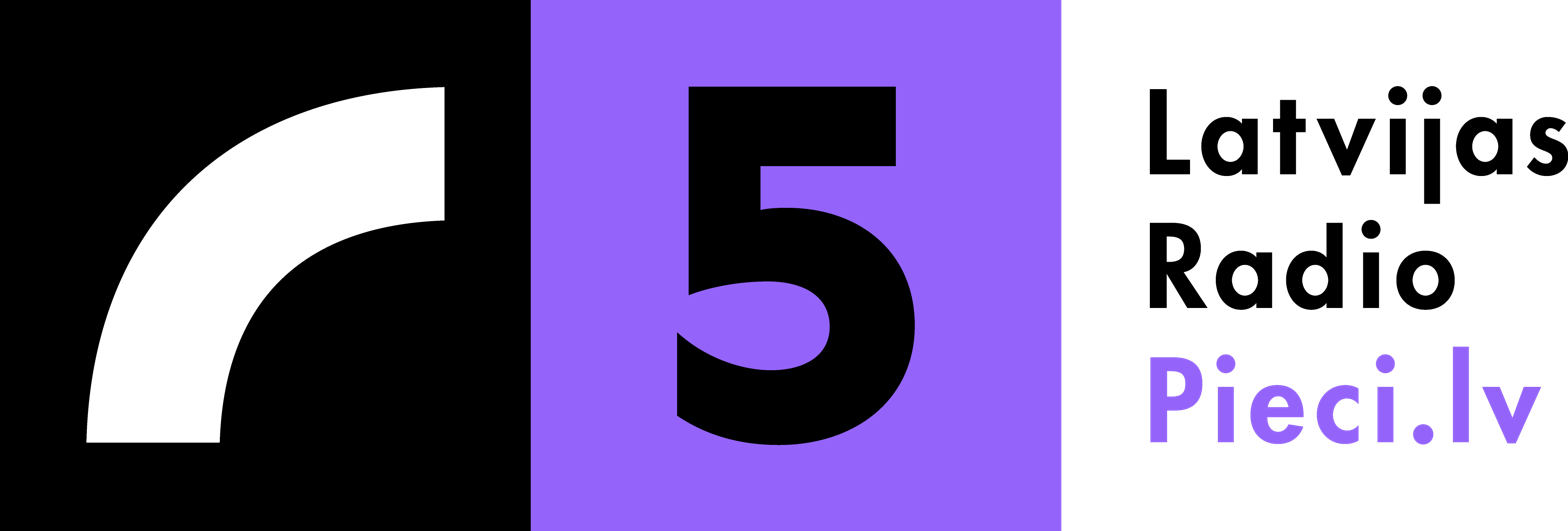
Latvijas Radio 5 – Pieci.lv

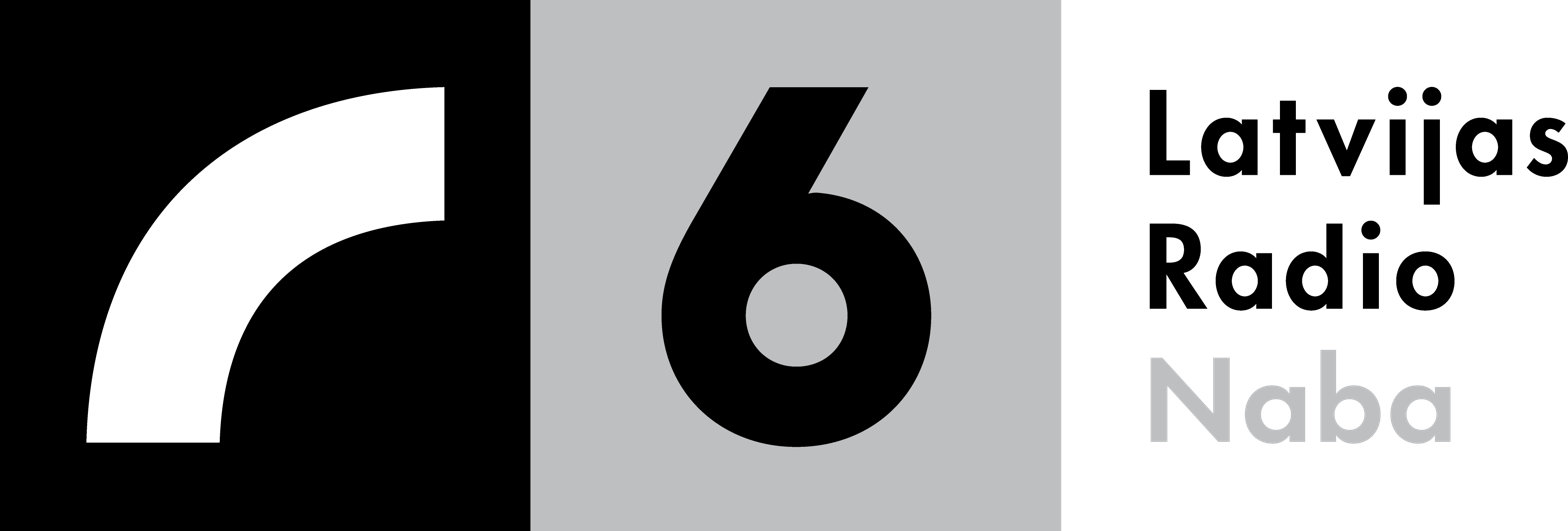
Latvijas Radio 6 – NABA

== See also ==
- Eastern Bloc information dissemination
