= Latvian Television =

Latvian public television broadcaster

Latvijas Televīzija
- Type: Public broadcaster
- Country: Latvia
- Availability: Latvia, online
- Headquarters: Riga
- Owner: LSM
- Launch date: 6 November 1954; 71 years ago
- Picture format: 1080i (HDTV), SD (some content)
- Channels: LTV1; LTV7 (formerly known as LTV2)
- Affiliation: European Broadcasting Union
- Official website: ltv.lsm.lv

Latvijas Televīzija (Latvian Television, LTV) is the state-owned public service television broadcaster in Latvia and a part of the Public Broadcasting of Latvia organization. LTV operates two channels: LTV1 in Latvian and LTV7 (previously called LTV2) in Latvian, which until 2025 featured selected programming in Russian.

The broadcaster has been fully funded by the state budget since 1 January 2021, when, after years of debate, it and radio broadcaster Latvijas Radio exited the advertising market.

LTV is a member of the European Broadcasting Union, having joined on 1 January 1993. From the restoration of independence in 1991 to 31 December 1992, it was a member of the International Radio and Television Organisation (OIRT). LTV hosted the annual Eurovision Song Contest in 2003, as well as the IIHF Men's Ice Hockey Championships in 2006 and 2021, and the inaugural Eurovision Choir of the Year competition in 2017.

LTV1 broadcasts the Eurovision Song Contest in Latvia each year, and LTV7 also broadcasts many sport events such as the Olympics, various Latvian league and national team games, the Ice Hockey World Championships (since 2018, extended 2028) and the FIFA World Cup.

== History ==
=== Origins, 1954 to 1993 ===
The first experimental broadcast of television in Latvia took place on 10 November 1937 at the Latvian Radio Society (Latvian: Latvijas Radio biedrība) during a public viewing in Riga, using an oscilloscope with the screen size of 45x50 cm. There were plans to launch regular broadcasts of "visual radio" by the Latvian Radiophone in the early 1940s, but these were suspended by the occupation of Latvia and World War II.

The first contemporary test broadcasts started on 6 November 1954 from a studio in Soviet Riga in black-and-white, which were seen by the 20 owners of personal television sets. It is the first and oldest national television station in the Baltic countries. Regular broadcasting started on 20 November 1954. At the beginning, LTV did not have rights to create their own programming except live shows. In 1955, the Riga Television studio in Nometņu iela, Āgenskalns was created to produce its own programming and the first TV tower in Latvia was built.

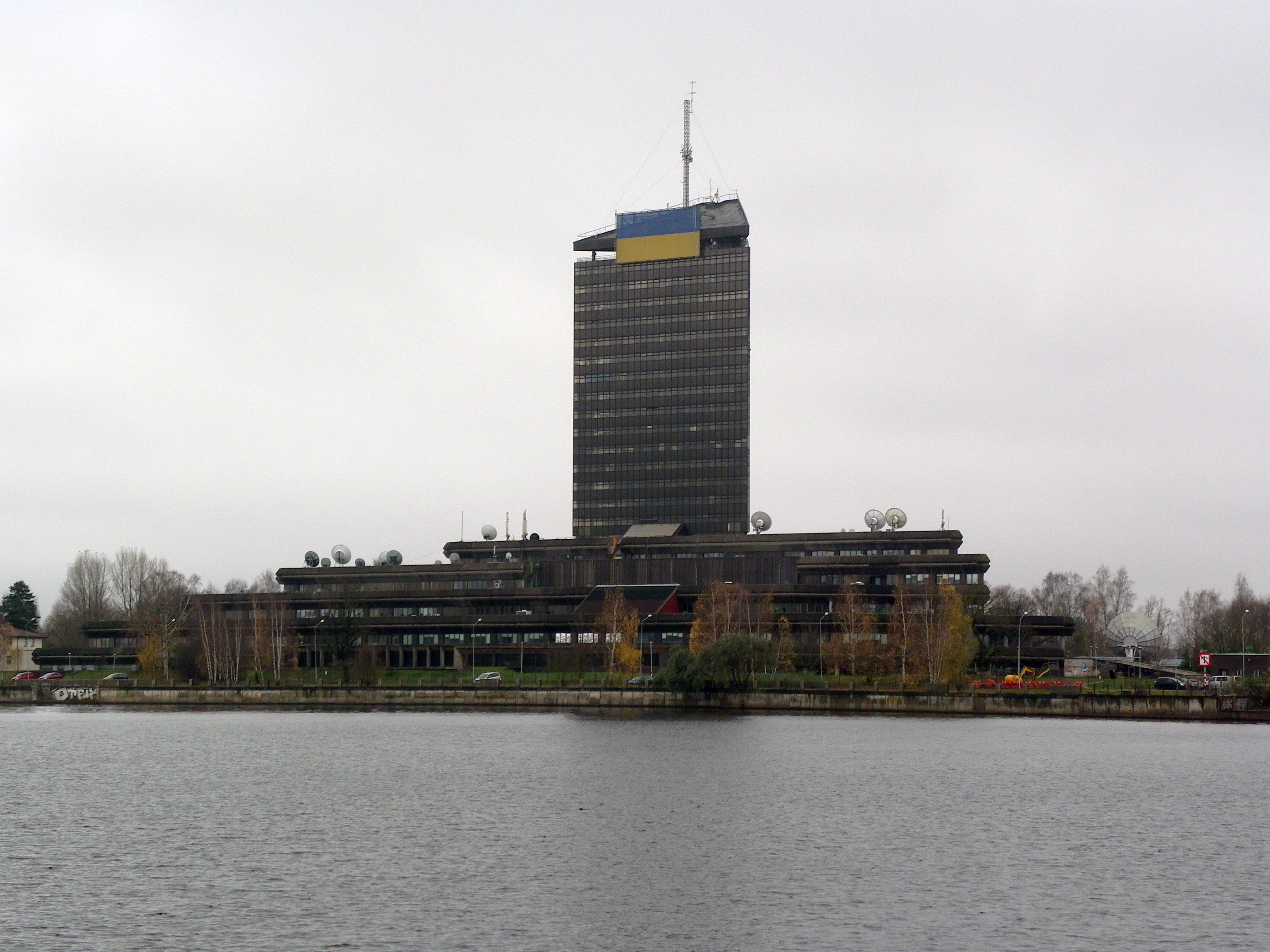
The Latvian Television building in Zaķusala, Riga

On 19 March 1958, the first evening news show went on the air - this is considered to be the founding date of the LTV News Service (LTV Ziņu dienests. In 1963, it was renamed Panorāma, as it is known to this day. A second TV channel was launched in 1961 and both channels converted to SÉCAM color in 1974. In 1986, both the Riga TV Tower and the LTV television headquarters in Zaķusala were officially completed.

During the Third Latvian National Awakening, the broadcaster became more open to Glasnost-style freedom of expression and criticism of Soviet rule in Latvia, most notably in the form of the Labvakar political talk show (1988–1993). The buildings in Zaķusala were one of the locations defended during The Barricades. During the 1991 Soviet coup d'état attempt troops of the OMON unit seized the LTV building on 21 August, suspending broadcasts for two days.

=== 1993–2013 ===
LTV logo, 2006 to 2022.

On 1 January 1993, Latvian Television and Radio Latvia became members of the European Broadcasting Union (EBU). The two channels received American and Australian TV series which were distributed in Latvia by TV3, which at the time shared two days of Channel 31 in Riga. In 1996, with the creation of LNT, TV3 announced its withdrawal from the frequency and from LTV, meaning that the rights to air popular series such as The Bold and the Beautiful, E Street and Paradise Beach were at risk. In order to continue delivering the series to the public, LTV began direct negotiations with the distributors to assure their continued airing. On 2 February 1998, LTV along with LNT, Channel 31 (now TV3) and TV Riga (later TV5) converted to PAL color. In 2003, LTV2, the second channel, was rebranded as LTV7. The 7 was due to the initial slogan of the renamed service, "Because every day is like a holiday", which was coupled with its new programming concept, content and higher advertising rates.

In 2008, LTV started broadcasting in digital terrestrial TV standard in MPEG2 format, changing to MPEG4 format on 1 August 2009 as the telecommunications company Lattelecom has been chosen to be the official integrator of digital terrestrial TV in Latvia. Analogue distribution of LTV7 finished on 1 March 2010. LTV completely finished broadcasting LTV1 in analogue format on 1 July 2010. Both LTV channels are also available on the Sirius satellite's Nordic beam as part of the Viasat package.

=== Public Broadcasting of Latvia (since 2013) ===
REplay.lv logo (2015–2022)

Since 2013, LTV has come under the umbrella of Public Broadcasting of Latvia (Latvian: Latvijas Sabiedriskie mediji, LSM) along with Latvian Radio, as part of the unification process of both public broadcasters. LTV and Radio Latvia now share one news portal, LSM.lv, and an online streaming service (REplay.lv), with content from both broadcasters. A third channel with Eesti Televisioon was planned, with programming in the Russian language, in 2015.

LTV changed its aspect ratio from 4:3 to 16:9 in 2013 (LTV7 did in 2012, doing 2012 Summer Olympics). Selected programming such as live broadcast of a staging of The Nutcracker by the Latvian National Opera on LTV1 in 2012 and the matches of the IIHF World Championships on LTV7 (2018–present), were shown in HD. In 2019 a full switch to HDTV broadcasts was announced for 2021 or 2022, although delayed in previous years due to financial constraints. After upgrading their broadcasting technology, both TV channels and content on the REplay.lv and LSM began a gradual switch to Full HD (1080p) on 19 May 2021 for cable and online broadcasts (the switch for free terrestrial operators is scheduled for 2022). The LTV News Service programs (Panorāma etc.) marked their switch to 1080p on 30 August by unveiling a new studio and visuals.

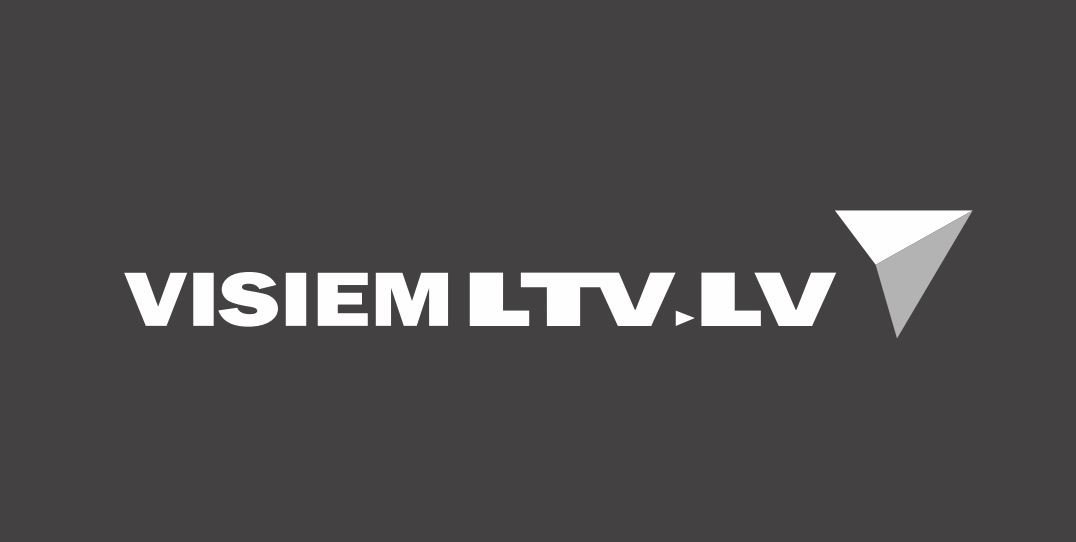
Visiem LTV logo (2016–2021)

In 2016, LTV launched the online channel Visiem LTV ('LTV to all', also styled VISIEMLTV.LV) for foreign viewers, mostly targeted for the Latvian diaspora. The programming is a mix of LTV1 and LTV7 broadcasts that are not restricted by copyright laws and are available globally.

Until 2021, the broadcaster was funded by grant-in-aid from the Latvian government (around 60%), with the remainder coming from television commercials. Although moving LTV to licence fee funding was long been debated, this was often opposed by the government, with media analysts believing that the real reason for this is that the government is reluctant to lose the control of LTV that state-funding gives it.After years of debate, in June 2018 the Saeima unanimously voted to amend legislation allowing the public broadcaster to exit the advertising market and be fully funded by the state budget. In 2020 the necessary funding was earmarked by the Government of Latvia, with Latvijas Televīzija and Latvijas Radio exiting the ad market effective 1 January 2021.

The merger of LTV and Latvian Radio into LSM was completed on 2 January 2025

== See also ==
- Eastern Bloc information dissemination
- List of Latvian television channels
