= Livonian campaign (1617–1618) =

Theatre in Polish–Swedish War (1617–1618)

- Part of the Polish–Swedish War (1617–1618)
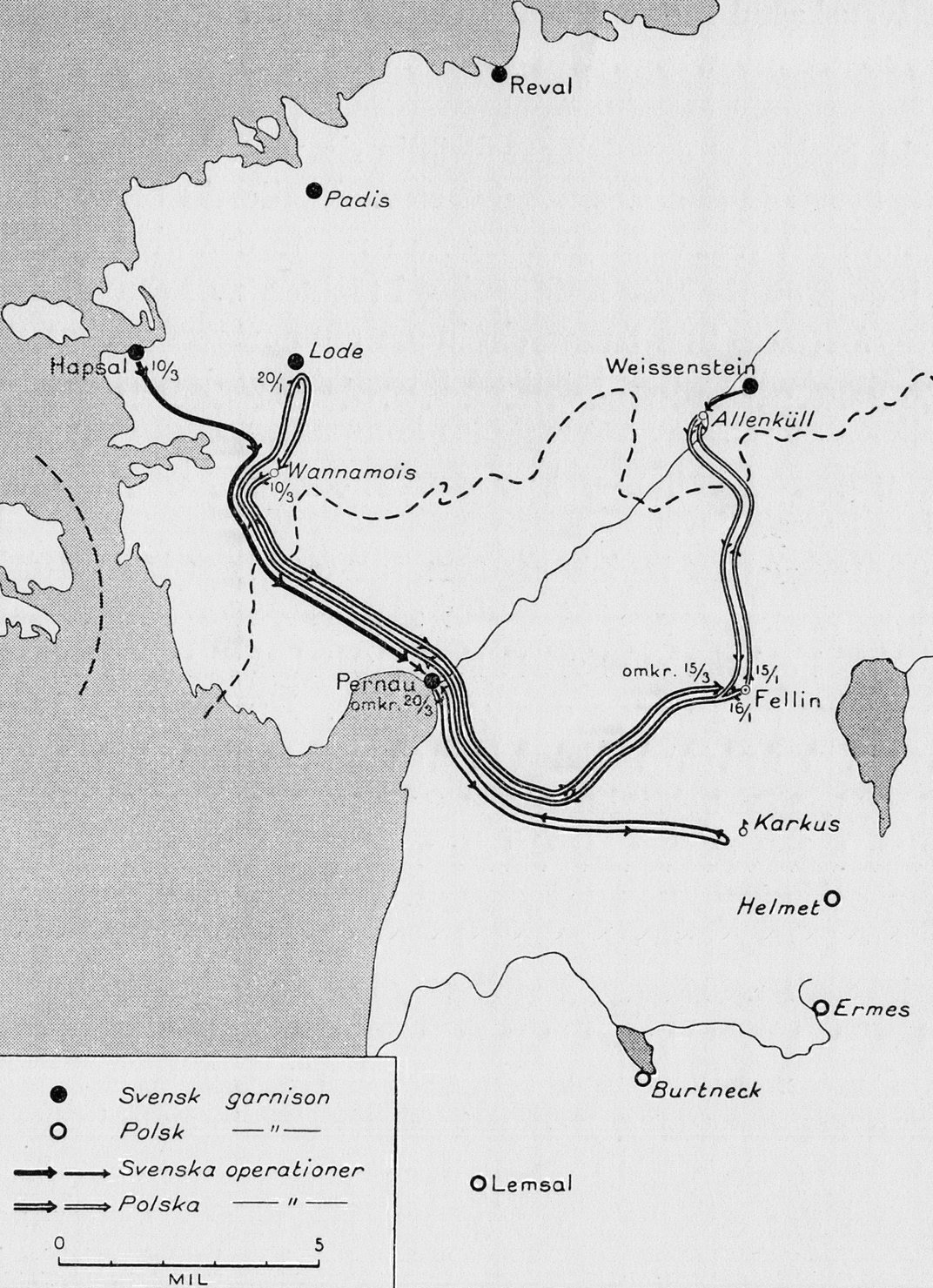
- Troop movements of both sides during the campaign.
Date	1617 – 1618
Location	Livonia
Result	Inconclusive
Territorial changes	City of Pärnu ceded to Sweden

Belligerents
(yes) Swedish Empire; Duchy of Courland	Polish–Lithuanian Commonwealth; Duchy of Courland

Commanders and leaders
(Swedish Empire) Nils Stiernsköld (Duchy of Courland and Semigallia) Wolmar Fahrensbach	(Polish–Lithuanian Commonwealth) Krzysztof Radziwiłł (Polish–Lithuanian Commonwealth) Jan Siciński

Strength
4,000 men	Hundreds of troops

Casualties and losses
At least 60 killed	Unknown

Livonian campaign was the main theatre of the Polish–Swedish War (1617–1618). While the main Swedish objective to capture Riga failed, the Swedes managed to capture Pärnu, which they held for the next two years.

== Background ==
In 1616, Wolmar Fahrensbach, the governor of Courland, began secret talks with the Swedish Government. Due to these talks, he managed to ally Courland with Sweden against the Commonwealth.

The talks were mostly caused by Fahrensbach not receiving the rank of commander over the fortress of Dünamünde, which caused him to take offense at the Commonwealth. He had also initiated a conflict with the city of Riga. The situation in Sweden was different. Sweden had lost control of Älvsborg, which was a strategic fortress situated on the Kattegat during the Kalmar War. Sweden was forced to pay one million riksdaler to get the fortress back, which was a lot of money. The Swedish Chancellor, Axel Oxenstierna, convinced the king to take advantage of the situation in Courland.

=== Prelude ===
Since the Swedish state had little money, and foreign subsidies being unavailable at the time, Gustavus Adolphus chose to invade Livonia in order to save money for the upkeep of his army.

=== Swedish plan and preparations ===
==== Swedish forces ====
For the invasion, Gustavus chose Nils Stiernsköld as the commander. Gustavus' reforms in the Swedish army had barely begun, and thus only enlisted troops would be utilized for the invasion. Few men were available in Sweden, so Stiernsköld accordingly sailed to the Dutch Republic, where he enlisted a regiment of 1,200 men divided into six companies of infantry. The Dutch Regiment, along with Jacob De la Gardie's Regiment (Fältherrens regemente) and three independent companies, which were already in Sweden, would form the expeditionary force. In total, it consisted of around 3,700 men at most, all infantry.

== Campaign ==
Swedish attack on the Livonians in 1617

On 19 June 1617, a Swedish squadron appeared near Dynegotn, prompting Colonel Wolmar Farensbach, commander of the small garrison, to surrender two days later. Shortly afterward, on 23 June, another Swedish landing force captured Ventspils and Düna Redoubt, while the Swedish fleet blockaded the port of Riga. In July, Swedish troops attacked Pernau, but the attack failed. In August, Swedish troops again attacked Pernau, which surrendered after three days of fighting. Four days later, Salis was also taken by the Swedes. As a result, within only two months Sweden gained control of a long stretch of the Livonian coast, with Riga remaining the only major exception.

Polish counterattack in 1617

Only then did the Polish–Lithuanian Commonwealth begin preparing for war on the new front. Wolmar Farensbach returned to the Polish side after being promised forgiveness for his betrayal, while command of the Lithuanian forces was given to Field Hetman Krzysztof II Radziwiłł. Radziwiłł proved to be an effective and decisive commander. Thanks to his leadership and organizational skills, Lithuanian troops quickly recaptured nearly all lost fortresses except Pärnu. He then entered Courland, intending to incorporate the duchy into the Commonwealth after the betrayal of Prince Wilhelm Kettler had triggered Gustav Adolf’s intervention. Sigismund III opposed this plan and instead granted Courland to Frederick Kettler, who had remained loyal to Poland. Angered by the king’s decision, Radziwiłł returned to Lithuania in December 1617, leaving Jan Siciński in command of the army.

=== 1618 ===
==== Expedition to Estonia ====
The campaign lasted from 25 January until late March 1618. Although the Polish forces were relatively strong, consisting of five hussar banners, two reiter units, three Cossack detachments, and a dragoon formation, the expedition failed to achieve any significant victories. After leaving camp, the troops marched toward Allakul, hoping to gain the support of the Estonian nobility, but these efforts proved unsuccessful.

Siciński, an experienced commander trained under Krzysztof “Piorun” Radziwiłł, then led a rapid march past Pernau, where several minor skirmishes with Swedish forces took place, eventually reaching Lode on 30 January 1618. During this remarkable winter operation, the Polish troops covered more than 320 kilometres in only five days. Despite the speed of the advance, the mission ended unsuccessfully. The fortress garrison, numbering around 140 soldiers, resisted fiercely and survived a siege or blockade lasting approximately one month.

Following the failed operation, Siciński first withdrew his forces to the former camp near Fellin, arriving there on 25 March. Later, likely fearing a Swedish counterattack, he crossed the Dvina River and stationed his army in Courland. Encouraged by the Polish retreat and seeking revenge for earlier raids, Swedish troops launched a surprise attack on Rek’s banner stationed at Karkus, destroying it. At the time, Rek himself was recovering from injuries in Riga, while command had been left to Bortz, lieutenant of Szmeling. This change in leadership may have weakened discipline and reduced the unit’s readiness.

The loss of the banner deeply concerned Sigismund III. On 26 May 1618, the king ordered an investigation to determine responsibility for the disaster. Overall, the expedition was viewed negatively by the monarch. Sigismund III criticized the army for committing acts of plunder against civilians and returning from the campaign without success, while exhausting their horses through forced marches.
