= Ilmi =

Female given name and surname

Ilmi is a given name and surname. Notable people with the name include:

- Ilmi Hallsten (1862–1936), Finnish teacher and politician
- Ilmi Kolla (1933–1954), Estonian poet
- Ilmi Parkkari (1926–1979), Finnish actress
- Ilmi Parmasto (born 1935), Estonian mycologist
- Shazia Ilmi (born 1970), Indian politician
