= Lili Kaelas =

Swedish archeologist and museum curator

Lili Sanelma Nyström
- Born: Lili Sanelma Lüüdik; 30 January 1919; Pärnu, Estonia
- Died: 9 December 2007 (aged 88); Örgryte, Gothenburg, Sweden
- Citizenship: Swedish
- Occupation: Archaeologist
- Spouses: Alexander Kaelas (m. 1939, divorced) Per Nyström (m. 1974)

Lili Sanelma Nyström (better known as Lili Kaelas; born 1919 in Estonia; died 2007 in Sweden) was a Swedish archaeologist and museum director. She was the wife of Swedish historian and the former governor of Gothenburg and Bohus County, Per Nyström. She was the founder of the Lili Kaelas stiftelse för arkeologisk forskning (foundation for archaeological research).

== Life ==
Lili Kaelas was born on 30 January 1919 in Pärnu, Estonia. She was the daughter of sea captain Johannes Lüdig, and his wife Wendla Lüdig, née Dufwa. She studied at the University of Tartu where she became a Master of Philosophy in 1943, and in 1945 she came to Stockholm, Sweden via Finland as a refugee. There she was recruited as an assistant for the curator Axel Bagge in the Swedish History Museum. Bagge was the head of the museum's Stone and Bronze Age department and needed help with the translation of Finnish and Baltic languages. She then helped him with the translations, and afterward together created and published scientific studies on the southern Swedish age of stone and ceramics. Encouraged by Bagge, in 1953, she then studied archeology herself and graduated with a licentiate degree in Nordic and comparative archaeology from Stockholm University.

Subsequently, she got the opportunity to work as a curator at Statens historiska museum, and later along with Axel Bagge, co-authored Die Funde aus Dolmen und Ganggräbern in Schonen, Schweden (The finds from dolmens and passage graves in Skåne, Sweden). In 1957, she was appointed as the curator of the Gothenburg archaeological museum, and in 1968, she became the head of the museum, succeeding Carl-Axel Moberg. In 1983, during her last year of service, she also was the acting director of the Gothenburg Historical Museum. She participated in several Swedish and foreign conferences in archeology, even after her retirement, and in 1995 she arranged an extensive cultural-historical exhibition called Estland - landet mellan öst och väst at Gothenburg City Library.

Lilli Kaelas was married twice, the first was to the lawyer Alexander Kaelas (1911-1964) in 1939. The second was to the governor of the counties of Gothenburg and Bohus, Per Nyström, on 2 November 1974. Lilli Kaelas died on 9 December 2007 in Örgryte, Gothenburg.

== Awards and honors ==
Lilli Kaelas has received several honors and awards for her efforts and service. She received the membership of The Royal Society of Arts and Sciences in Gothenburg (KVVS) in 1974, and that same year she also earned an honorary membership of the Prehistoric Society of Great Britain. In 1981, she received Göteborgs Stads (Gothenburg city’s) merit award, and in 1989, she was awarded the University of Gothenburg's merit medal Pro arte et scientia.

== Bibliography ==
- Vem är hon : kvinnor i Sverige, [Biografisk uppslagsbok], huvudredaktör; Kerstin Öhrström, Norstedts, Stockholm 1988. ISBN 91-1-863422-2.
- Grosjean, Alexia (2018). Svenskt kvinnobiografiskt lexikon [Biographical Dictionary of Swedish Women]. University of Gothenburg. ISBN 978-91-639-7594-3.
- Kaelas, Lili, 'Kvinna i arkeologins högborg: och sedan', Arkeologiska liv., S. 105-122, 1995
- Kaelas, Lili, ’Göteborgs Arkeologiska Museum, en krönika om åren 1957-1983’, Västsvenska arkeologihistorier, 1999
