= Pärnu =

City in Estonia

- Town
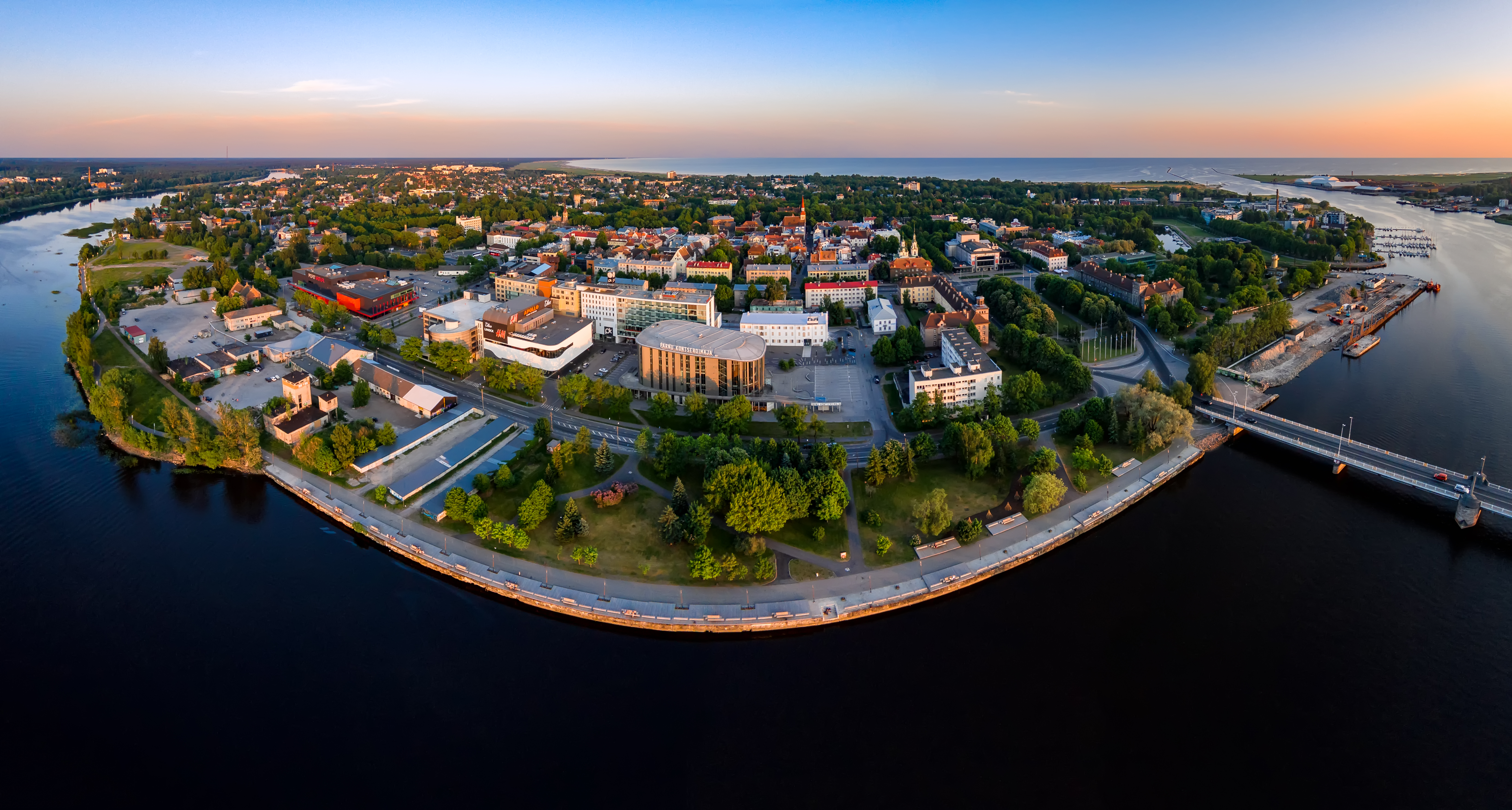
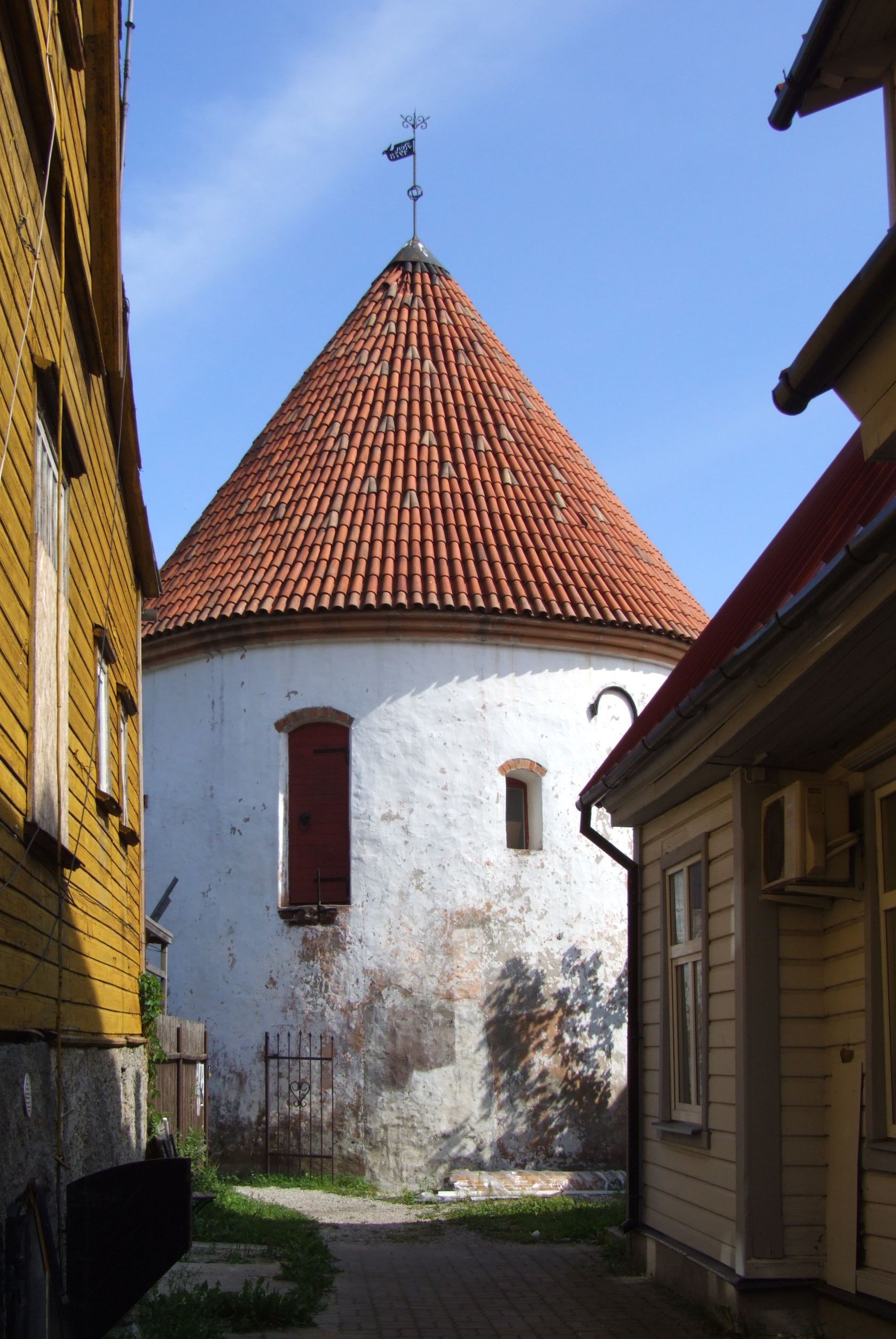
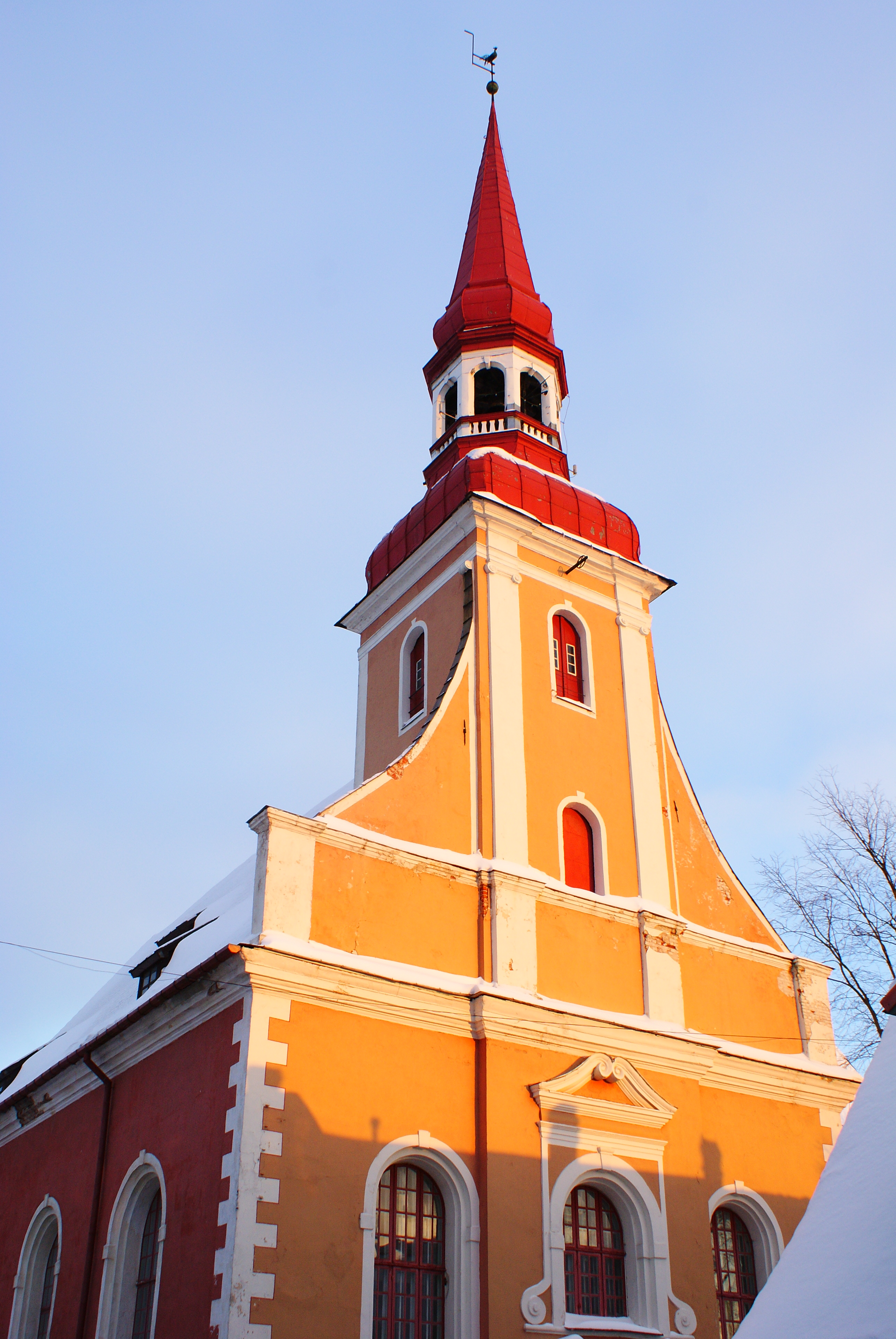
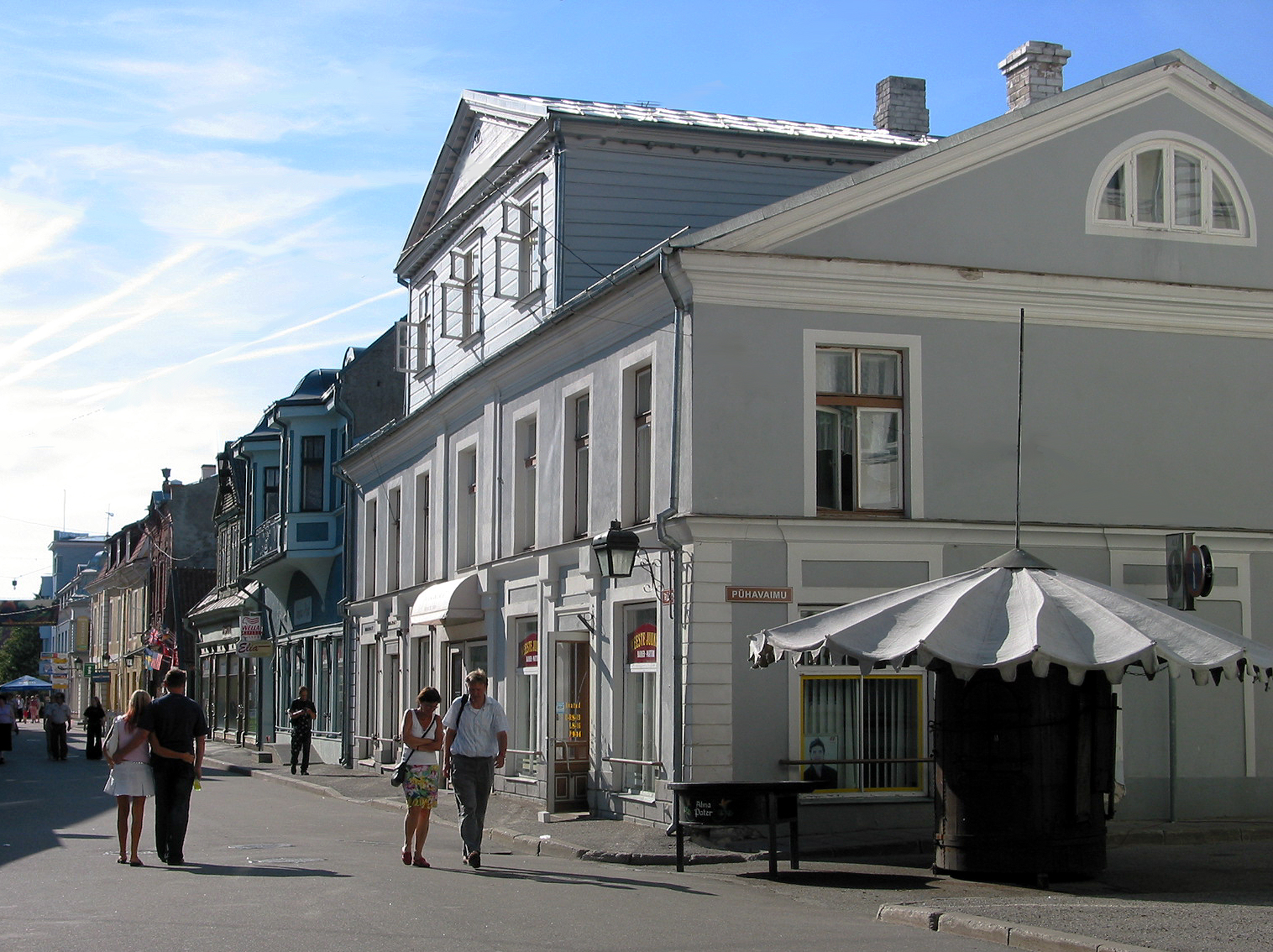
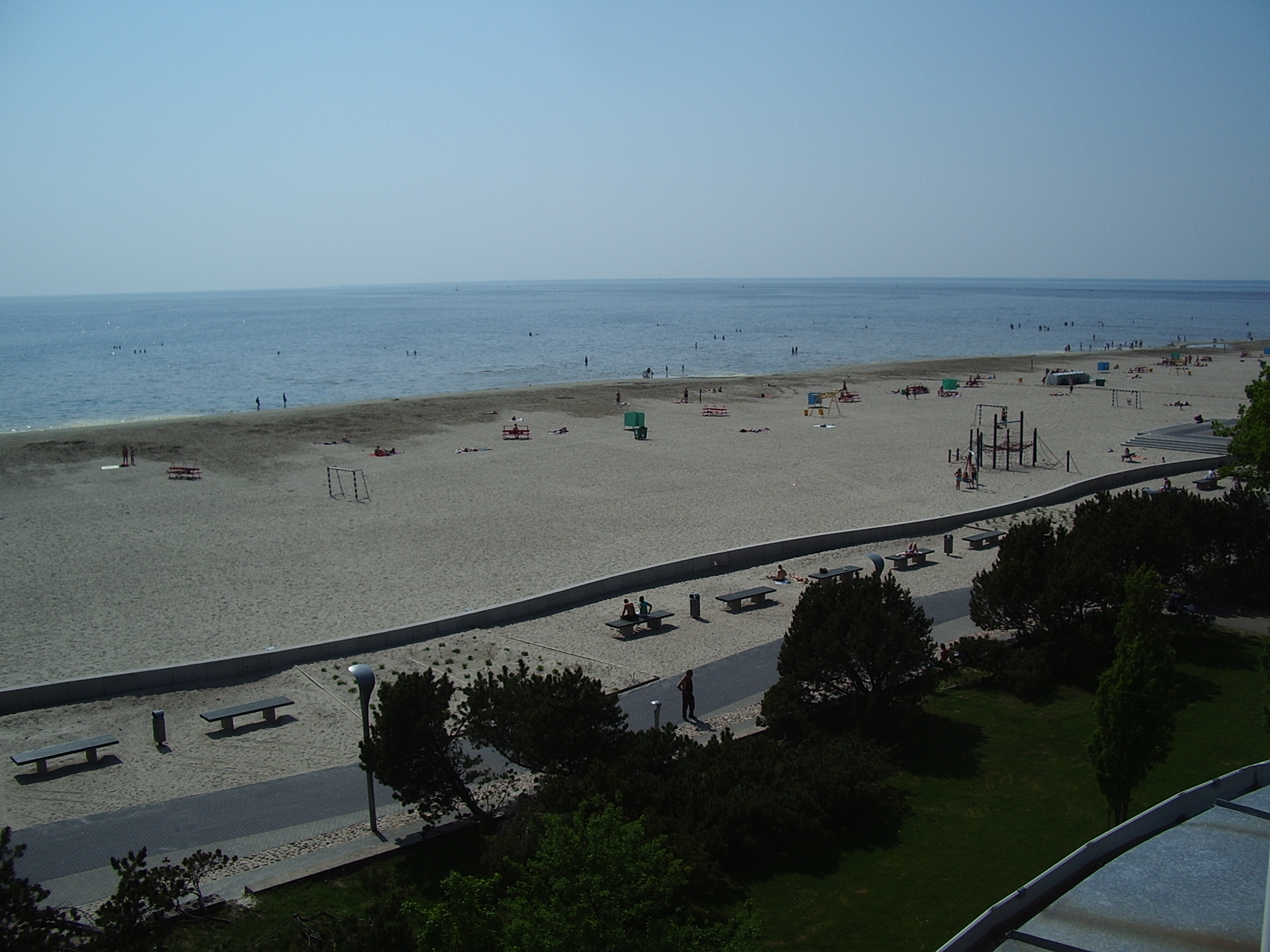
- From top: Pärnu city centre; Red tower; Elisabeth church; the main street; the beach

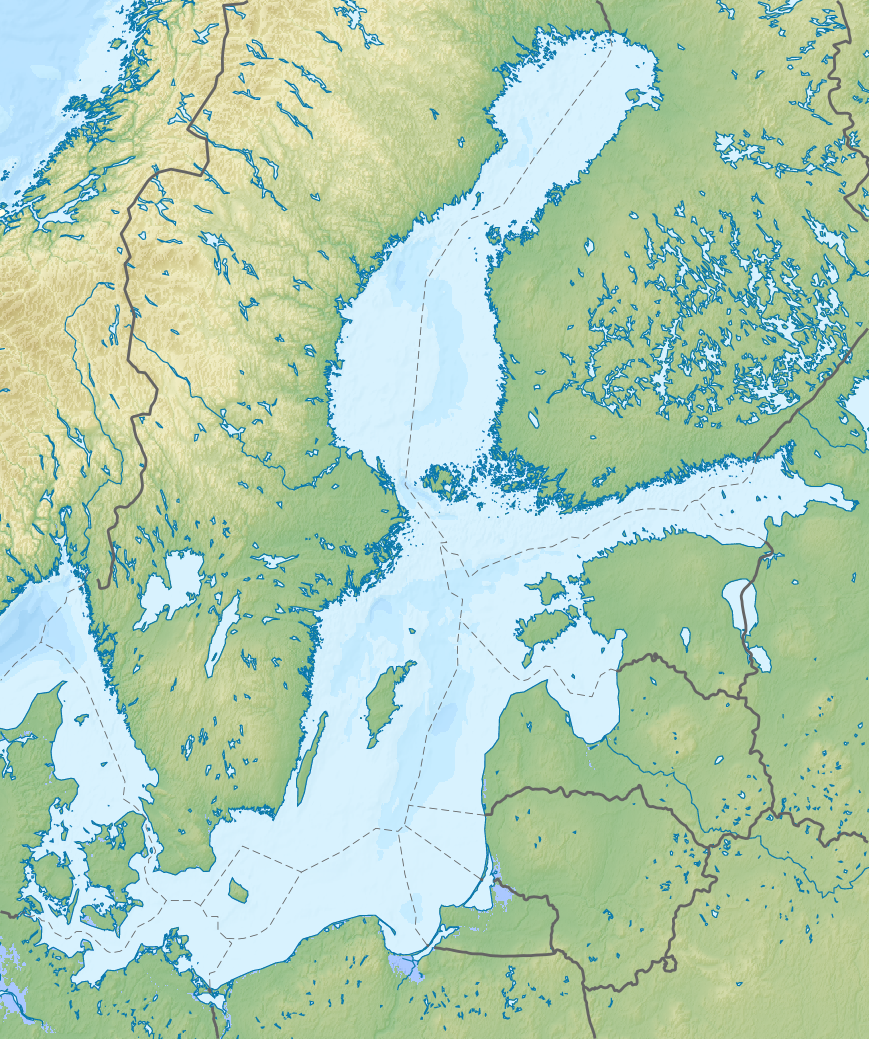
- Location within Europe Location within Baltic Sea region Location within Estonia
- Coordinates: 58°23′N 24°30′E
- Country: Estonia
- County: Pärnu
- Founded: 1251

Area
  - Total: 32.22 km^{2} (12.44 sq mi)
- Elevation: 10 m (33 ft)

Population (2024)
  - Total: 41,520
  - Rank: 4th
  - Density: 1,289/km^{2} (3,338/sq mi)

Ethnicity
  - Estonians: 83.7%
  - Russians: 10.6%
  - other: 5.7%
- Time zone: UTC+2 (EET)
  - Summer (DST): EEST

Pärnu (Estonian pronunciation: [ˈpærˑnu]) is a city in southwest Estonia. Pärnu is located 128 kilometres (80 mi) south of the Estonian capital, Tallinn, and 176 kilometres (109 mi) west of Estonia's second-largest city, Tartu. The city sits off the coast of Pärnu Bay, an inlet of the Gulf of Riga, which is a part of the Baltic Sea. In the city, the Pärnu River drains into the Gulf of Riga.

Pärnu is a popular summer holiday resort town among Estonians with many hotels, restaurants and large beaches. The city is served by Pärnu Airport.

== History ==
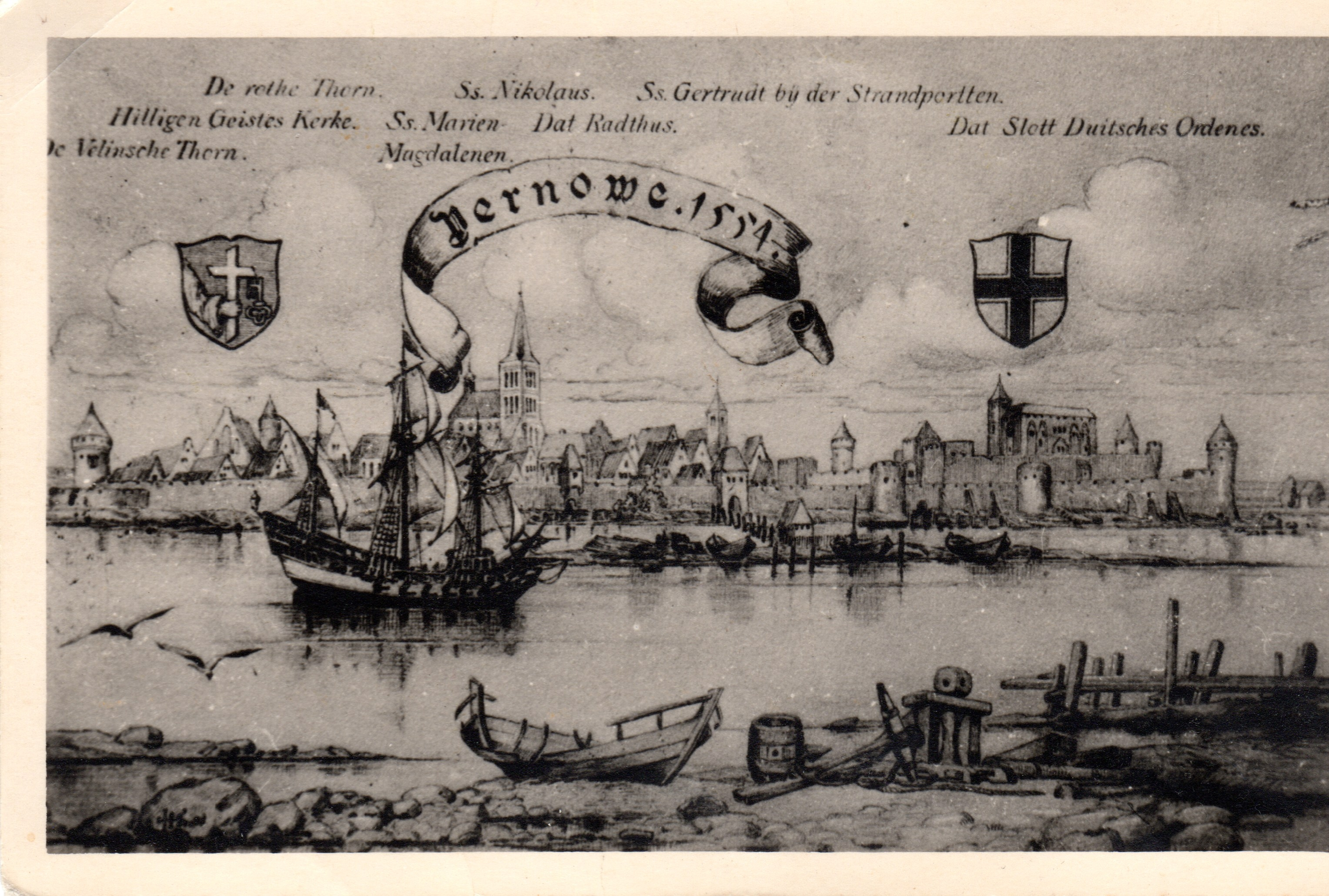
Pärnu in 1554

Pärnu or Old Pärnu (Latin: Perona, German: Pernau, Alt-Pernau, Estonian: Vana-Pärnu), which was founded by the bishop of Ösel–Wiek c. 1251, suffered heavily under pressure of the concurrent town, and was finally destroyed c. 1600. Another town, Embeke (later German: Neu-Pernau, Estonian: Uus-Pärnu) was founded by the Teutonic Order, who began building an ordensburg nearby in 1265. The latter town, then known by the German name of Pernau, was a member of the Hanseatic League and an important ice-free harbor for Livonia.

The Polish–Lithuanian Commonwealth took control of town between 1560 and 1617; the Poles and Lithuanians fought the armies of the Kingdom of Sweden nearby in 1609. Sweden took control of the town during the 1558–1583 Livonian War and it became part of Swedish Livonia. In 1617, during the Polish–Swedish War of 1617–1618, Swedish forces assaulted the town on two occasions, failing once in July 1617, and later succeeding in August of the same year.

The Academia Gustavo-Carolina (predecessor of modern University of Tartu) was relocated from Tartu (Dorpat) to Pärnu in 1699, and operated there until 1710. The university has still maintained a branch campus in Pärnu to this day (1,000 students in the 2004/2005 school year).

During the 1700–1721 Great Northern War, the Kingdom of Sweden then lost Pärnu along with the rest of Livonia to the Tsardom of Russia in the 1710 Capitulation of Estonia and Livonia and the 1721 Treaty of Nystad, following the Great Northern War; the city also bore the name Пернов, Pernov—an "adapted" German name—among the Russians.

Pärnu belonged to the Governorate of Livonia of the Russian Empire until 1917, when it was transferred to the short-lived autonomous Governorate of Estonia.

The city became part of independent Estonia in 1918 following World War I. During World War II, Estonia was invaded and occupied by the Soviet army in June 1940. Estonia (and Pärnu) was occupied by Nazi Germany from 1941 until 1944. After the war, Pärnu was part of Soviet-occupied Estonia until 1991, when Estonia restored its independence.

== Geography ==
=== Districts of Pärnu ===
There are seven districts in Pärnu: Ülejõe, Rääma, Vana-Pärnu, Kesklinn, Rannarajoon, Eeslinn and Raeküla.

=== Climate ===
Pärnu lies within the temperate humid continental climate zone.

Climate data for Pärnu (normals 1991–2020, extremes 1842–present)
Month	Jan	Feb	Mar	Apr	May	Jun	Jul	Aug	Sep	Oct	Nov	Dec	Year
Record high °C (°F)	9.0 (48.2)	8.3 (46.9)	19.6 (67.3)	26.2 (79.2)	31.2 (88.2)	32.6 (90.7)	34.1 (93.4)	33.4 (92.1)	28.0 (82.4)	22.4 (72.3)	12.6 (54.7)	10.3 (50.5)	34.1 (93.4)
Mean daily maximum °C (°F)	−0.8 (30.6)	−1 (30)	3.0 (37.4)	10.2 (50.4)	16.7 (62.1)	20.2 (68.4)	23.0 (73.4)	21.8 (71.2)	16.6 (61.9)	9.9 (49.8)	4.3 (39.7)	1.1 (34.0)	10.4 (50.7)
Daily mean °C (°F)	−3.0 (26.6)	−3.7 (25.3)	−0.5 (31.1)	5.4 (41.7)	11.4 (52.5)	15.4 (59.7)	18.3 (64.9)	17.2 (63.0)	12.5 (54.5)	6.8 (44.2)	2.2 (36.0)	−0.9 (30.4)	6.8 (44.2)
Mean daily minimum °C (°F)	−5.5 (22.1)	−6.6 (20.1)	−3.7 (25.3)	1.2 (34.2)	6.1 (43.0)	10.7 (51.3)	13.6 (56.5)	12.8 (55.0)	8.6 (47.5)	3.8 (38.8)	0.0 (32.0)	−3.1 (26.4)	3.2 (37.8)
Record low °C (°F)	−34.8 (−30.6)	−34.3 (−29.7)	−28.5 (−19.3)	−19.7 (−3.5)	−5.3 (22.5)	−0.1 (31.8)	3.4 (38.1)	2.6 (36.7)	−4.7 (23.5)	−10.9 (12.4)	−22.2 (−8.0)	−34.5 (−30.1)	−34.8 (−30.6)
Average precipitation mm (inches)	61 (2.4)	49 (1.9)	43 (1.7)	40 (1.6)	39 (1.5)	78 (3.1)	74 (2.9)	84 (3.3)	61 (2.4)	83 (3.3)	73 (2.9)	71 (2.8)	761 (30.0)
Average precipitation days (≥ 1.0 mm)	12.6	10.4	9.5	8.4	7.7	9.7	9.6	10.4	9.6	12.2	13.5	14.0	127.6
Average relative humidity (%)	88	87	81	73	68	73	75	78	82	86	89	89	81
Mean monthly sunshine hours	38.8	69.6	148.2	210.1	300.3	293.5	306.4	258.6	172.8	95.5	36.5	24.3	1,950.2
Source: Estonian Weather Service

Coastal temperature data for Pärnu
Month	Jan	Feb	Mar	Apr	May	Jun	Jul	Aug	Sep	Oct	Nov	Dec	Year
Average sea temperature °C (°F)	0.4 (32.72)	0.0 (32.00)	-0.1 (31.82)	1.9 (35.42)	7.7 (45.86)	14.7 (58.46)	19.4 (66.92)	19.1 (66.38)	15.9 (60.62)	10.7 (51.26)	6.7 (44.06)	3.6 (38.48)	8.3 (47.00)
Source 1: Seatemperature.org

=== Waterbodies ===
Pärnu River, Sauga River, Reiu River, Pärnu Moat, Pärnu Bay. Pärnu Moat was previously a part of Pärnu Fortress. Nowadays, it is mainly used as a venue for different events.

== Demographics ==
Year	1881	1897	1922	1934	1959	1970	1979	1989	2000	2011	2012	2017	2021
Population	12,966	12,898	18,499	20,334	22,367	50,224	54,051	53,885	45,500	39,728	40,401	40,700	40,228

Ethnic composition 1922–2021
Ethnicity	1922		1934		1941		1959		1970		1979		1989		2000		2011		2021	
Ethnicity	amount	%	amount	%	amount	%	amount	%	amount	%	amount	%	amount	%	amount	%	amount	%	amount	%
Estonians	16440	89.0	18436	90.7	18370	96.7	26669	73.9	34370	74.2	36748	74.1	37939	72.4	36112	79.4	33000	83.1	33682	83.7
Russians	494	2.67	469	2.31	328	1.73	–	–	9146	19.7	9676	19.5	10753	20.5	6951	15.3	5076	12.8	4256	10.6
Ukrainians	–	–	7	0.03	–	–	–	–	1010	2.18	1255	2.53	1631	3.11	966	2.12	671	1.69	887	2.20
Belarusians	–	–	–	–	–	–	–	–	412	0.89	493	0.99	546	1.04	297	0.65	179	0.45	184	0.46
Finns	–	–	14	0.07	11	0.06	–	–	517	1.12	543	1.09	534	1.02	331	0.73	254	0.64	324	0.81
Jews	236	1.28	248	1.22	0	0.00	–	–	190	0.41	138	0.28	76	0.15	35	0.08	20	0.05	13	0.03
Latvians	–	–	143	0.70	88	0.46	–	–	135	0.29	165	0.33	150	0.29	85	0.19	65	0.16	128	0.32
Germans	1030	5.57	871	4.28	–	–	–	–	–	–	105	0.21	132	0.25	69	0.15	50	0.13	55	0.14
Tatars	–	–	0	0.00	–	–	–	–	–	–	76	0.15	103	0.20	45	0.10	33	0.08	31	0.08
Poles	–	–	34	0.17	26	0.14	–	–	–	–	108	0.22	81	0.15	60	0.13	35	0.09	37	0.09
Lithuanians	–	–	10	0.05	6	0.03	–	–	60	0.13	80	0.16	83	0.16	82	0.18	60	0.15	58	0.14
unknown	0	0.00	28	0.14	8	0.04	0	0.00	0	0.00	0	0.00	0	0.00	226	0.50	59	0.15	129	0.32
other	281	1.52	74	0.36	167	0.88	9398	26.1	476	1.03	236	0.48	361	0.69	241	0.53	226	0.57	444	1.10
Total	18481	100	20334	100	19004	100	36067	100	46316	100	49623	100	52389	100	45500	100	39728	100	40228	100

== Economy ==
Significant flows of exports from Pärnu region and South-Estonia pass through the Port of Pärnu which lies at the mouth of the Pärnu River. In recent years, the port has developed into an important regional harbour for south-western and southern Estonia. Pärnu's fame as a rehabilitation and holiday resort dates back to the middle of the 19th century. The foundation of the first bathing facility in 1838 is considered the birth date of Pärnu resort. Today Pärnu has many qualities of a modern holiday resort – it has spas and rehabilitation centres, hotels, conference and concert venues, golf courses and tennis courts, restaurants and pubs. Its long tradition as a resort has made Pärnu well known in Finland and Scandinavian countries.

== Tourism ==
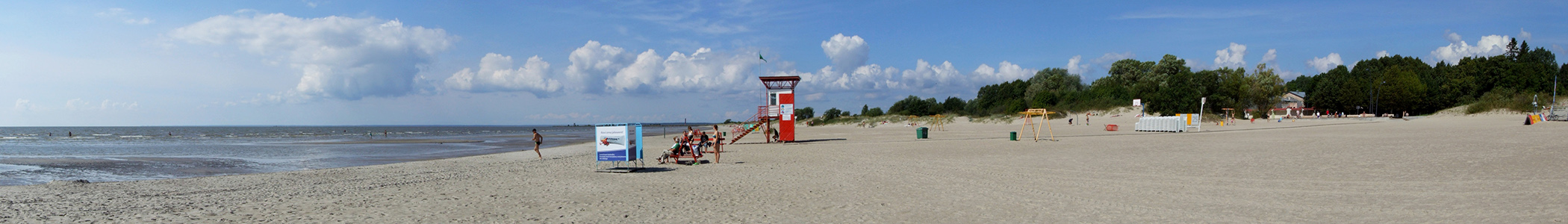
Pärnu beach

The majority of the tourists in Pärnu are Estonians, Finns and Swedes. In 1837, a tavern near the beach was made into a bathing establishment. The establishment accommodated 5–6 bathrooms that provided hot seawater baths in summer and operated as a sauna in winter. The wooden building was burnt down in the course of World War I. In 1927, the present stone building of Pärnu Mud Baths was erected at the same site. Kursaal hall dating from 1880 which is close by is used for concerts. Since 1996 Pärnu has been known as Estonia's Summer Capital.

Starting from 2015 the city of Pärnu hosts the annual Weekend Festival, the largest dance music festival in the Nordic and Baltic region. Stages are headlined by DJs from across the electronic dance music spectrum, with audiovisual support. Some of the past and upcoming artists to perform include Martin Garrix, David Guetta, Avicii, Steve Aoki, The Chainsmokers, Tiësto, Armin van Buuren, Hardwell, Robin Schulz, Afrojack, deadmau5, Knife Party, Desiigner and many more. Pärnu is also known for its seawall. According to legend, if a couple holds hands while journeying along the wall and kisses at its endpoint they will stay together forever.

== Notable people ==
- Ago Anderson, actor
- Elisabeth Aspe, writer
- Gustav Fabergé, jeweller
- Johann Voldemar Jannsen, journalist and poet
- Lili Kaelas, archeologist
- Tõnis Kasemets, race-car driver who has competed in ChampCar and IMSA
- Rein Kask, politician
- Egon Kaur, rally driver
- Paul Keres, chess grandmaster
- Lydia Koidula, poet
- Ilmi Kolla, poet
- Kaie Kõrb, prima ballerina
- Jüri Kukk, professor of chemistry, dissident, and political prisoner
- Karin Luts, artist
- Friedrich Martens, lawyer
- Kaili Närep, actress
- Rene Pais, professionally known as Syn Cole, DJ and musician
- Liisa Pulk, actress
- Rasmus Rändvee, singer
- Salme Reek, actress
- Georg Wilhelm Richmann, German physicist
- Erika Salumäe, track bicycle racer
- David Samoylov, poet
- August Sang, poet
- Olev Siinmaa, architect
- Maxim D. Shrayer, author and literary scholar
- Lilli Suburg, writer
- Avo Sõmer, musicologist, music theorist, composer
- Kristin Tattar, athlete, disc golf world champion

=== Honorary citizens ===
- 1886 Konstantin Possiet
- 1901 Friedrich Fromhold Martens
- 1934 Konstantin Päts
- 2007 Neeme Järvi
- 2008 Valter Ojakäär
- 2009 Jüri Jaanson
- 2017 Arbo Valdma
- 2024 Olaf Esna

== Gallery ==
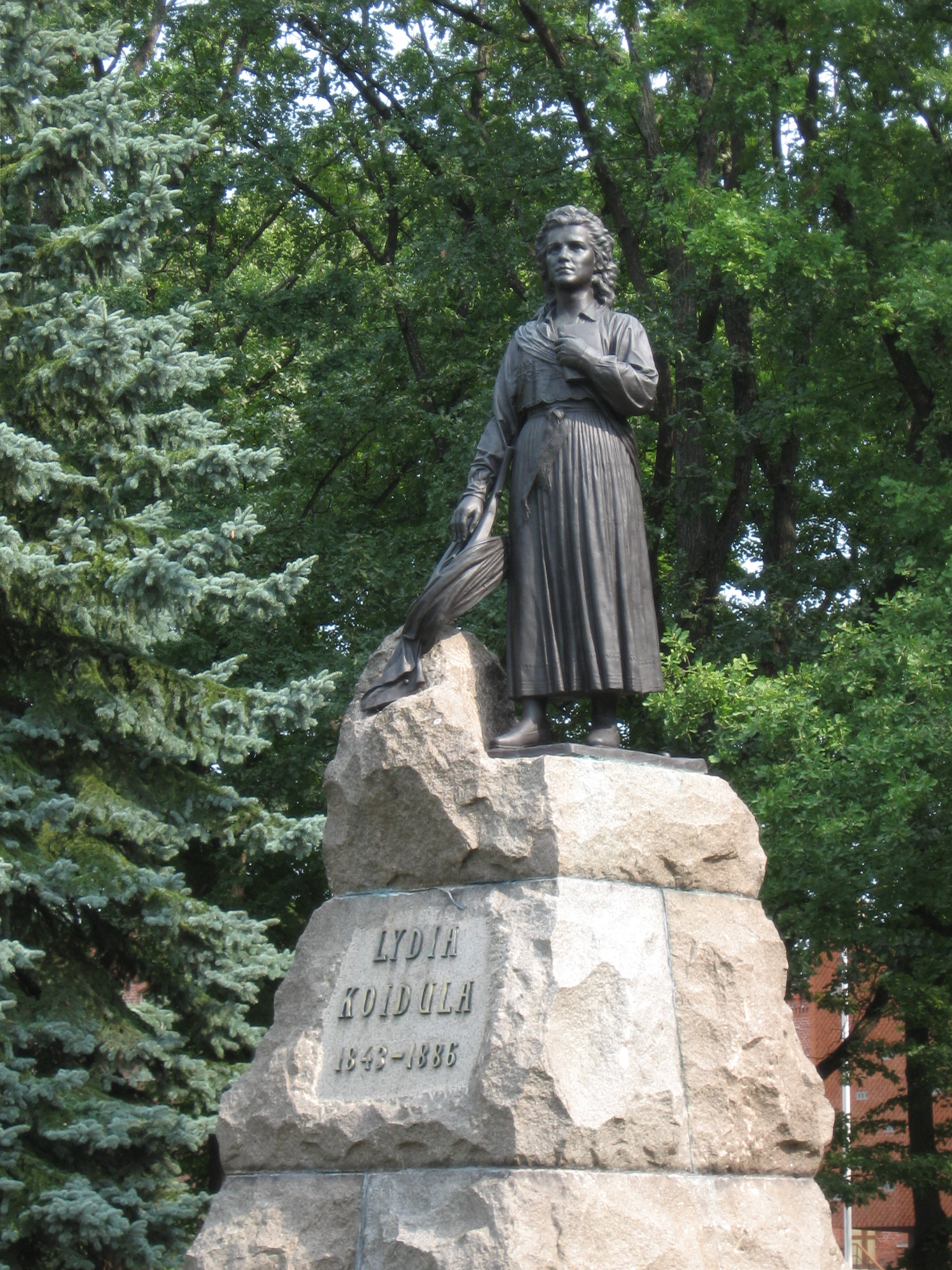
Monument to poet Lydia Koidula (by Amandus Adamson)

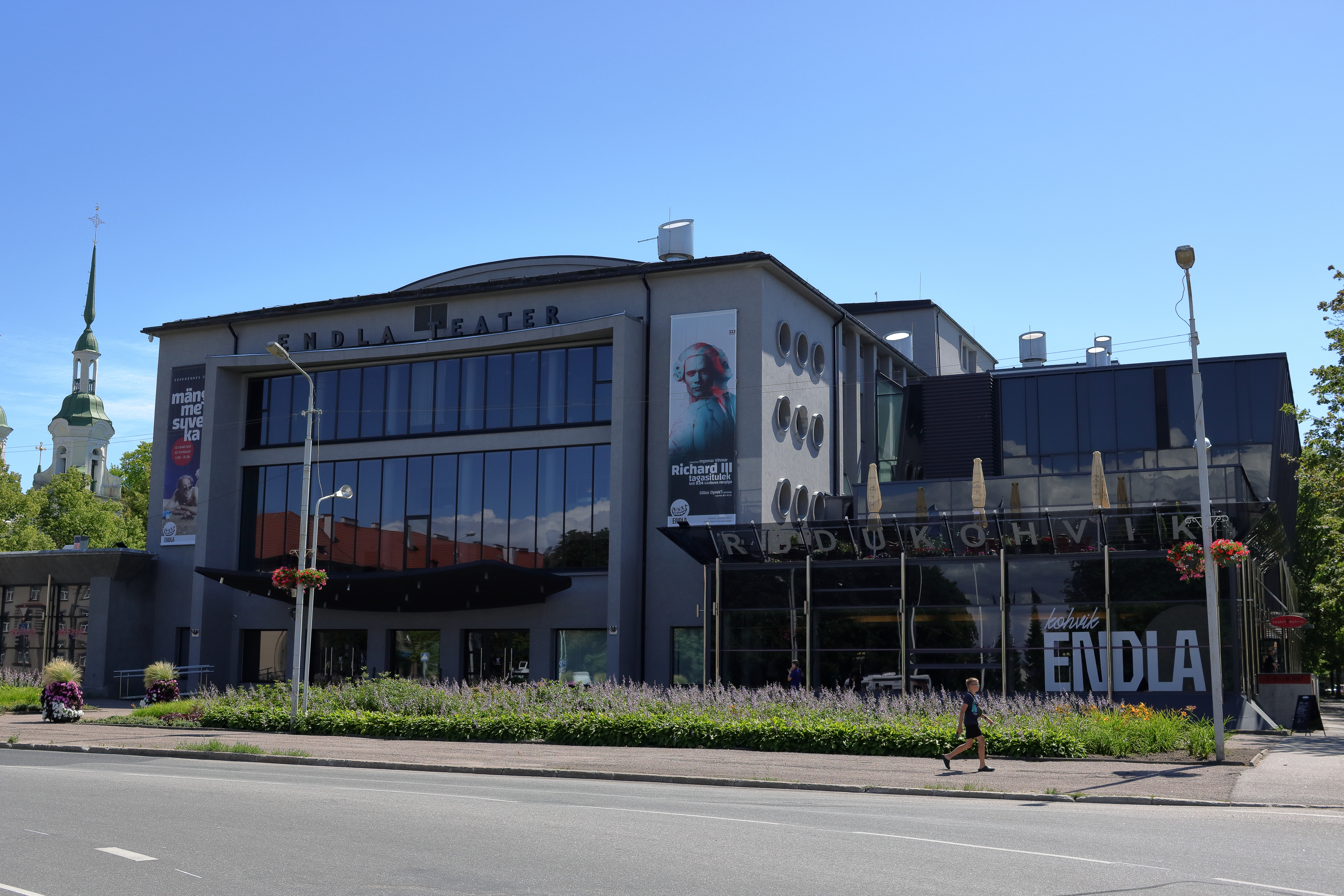
Endla Theatre

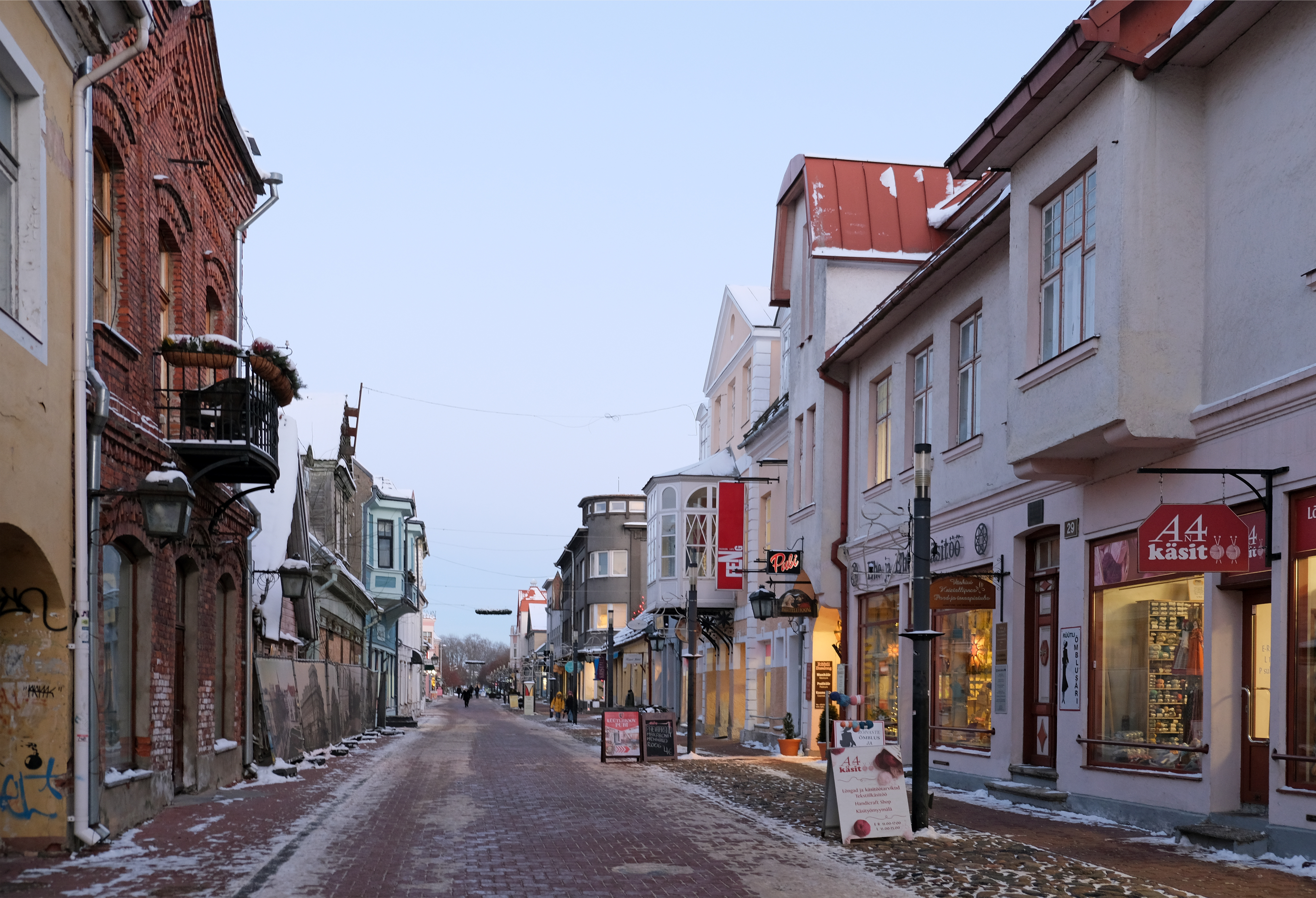
Rüütli street

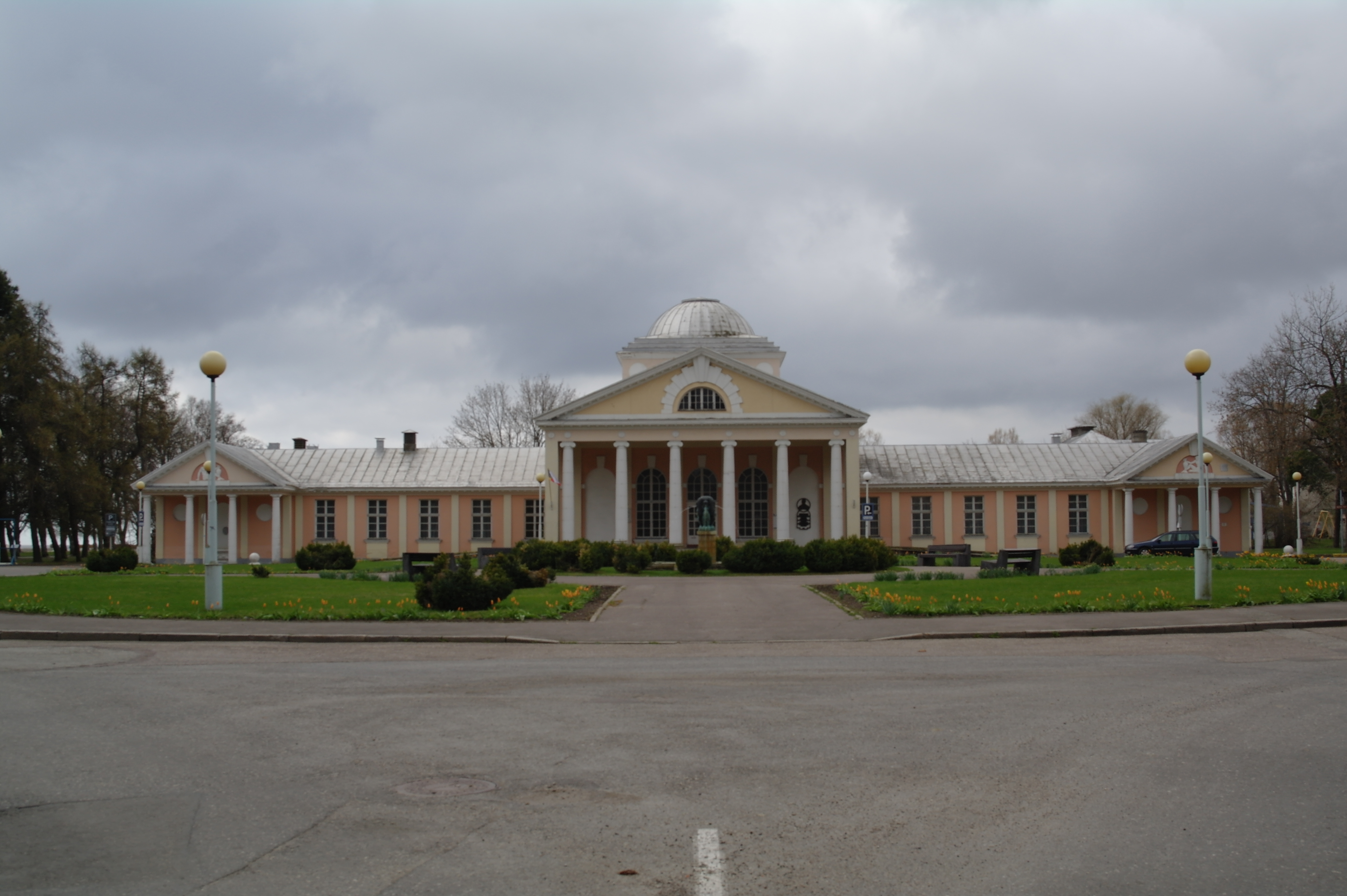
Pärnu mud baths

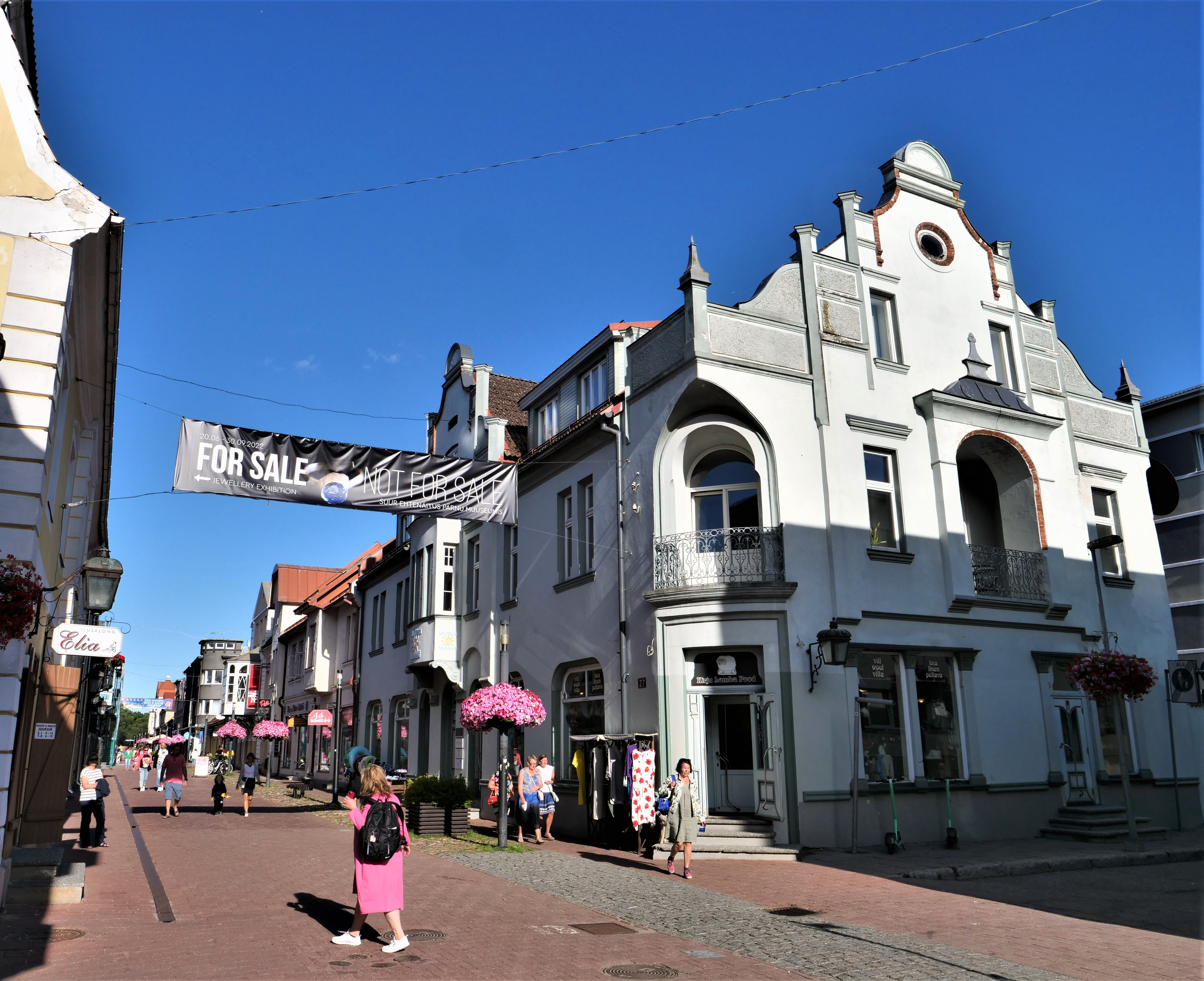
A street view

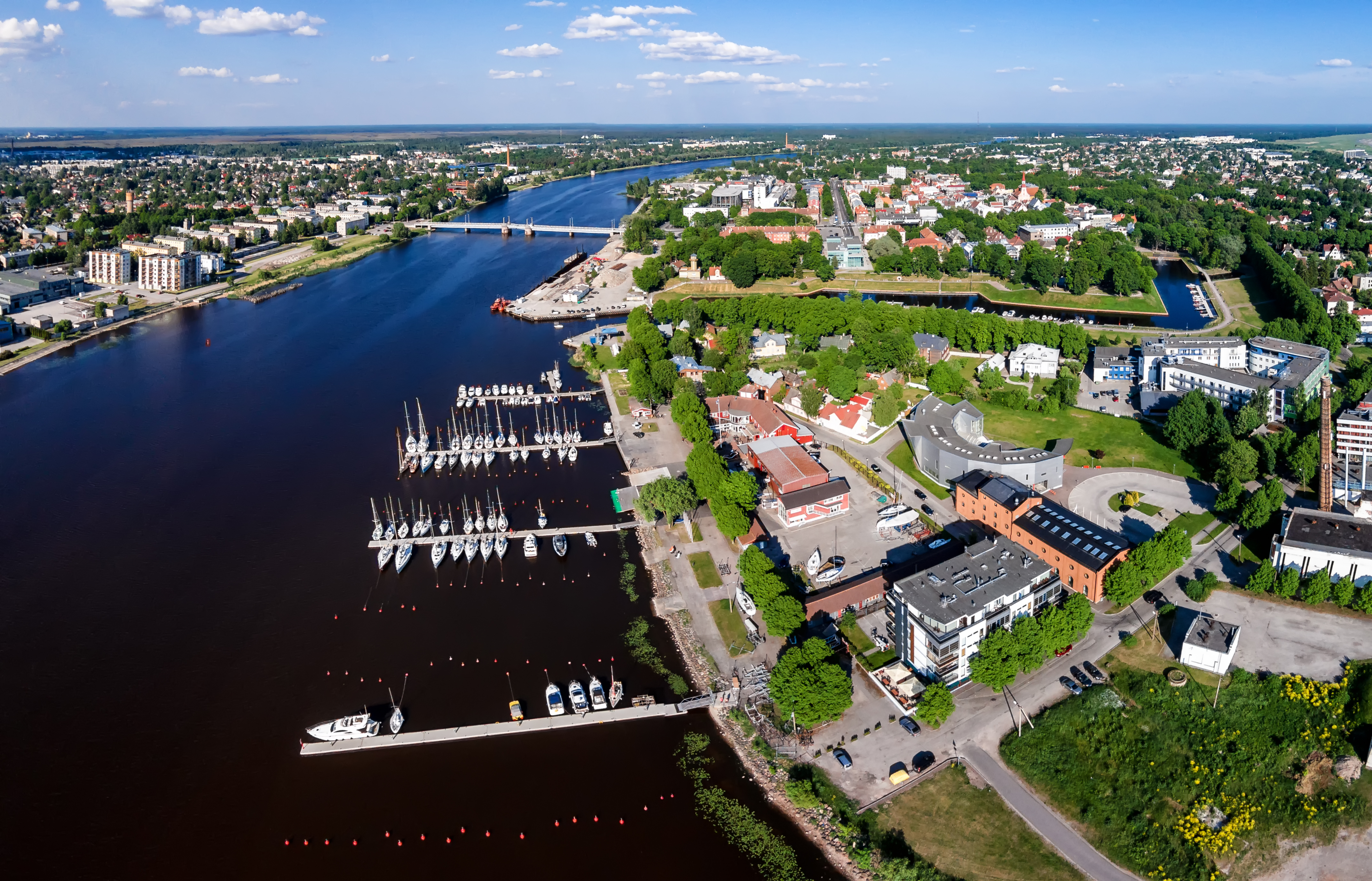
Pärnu from the bird's eye view

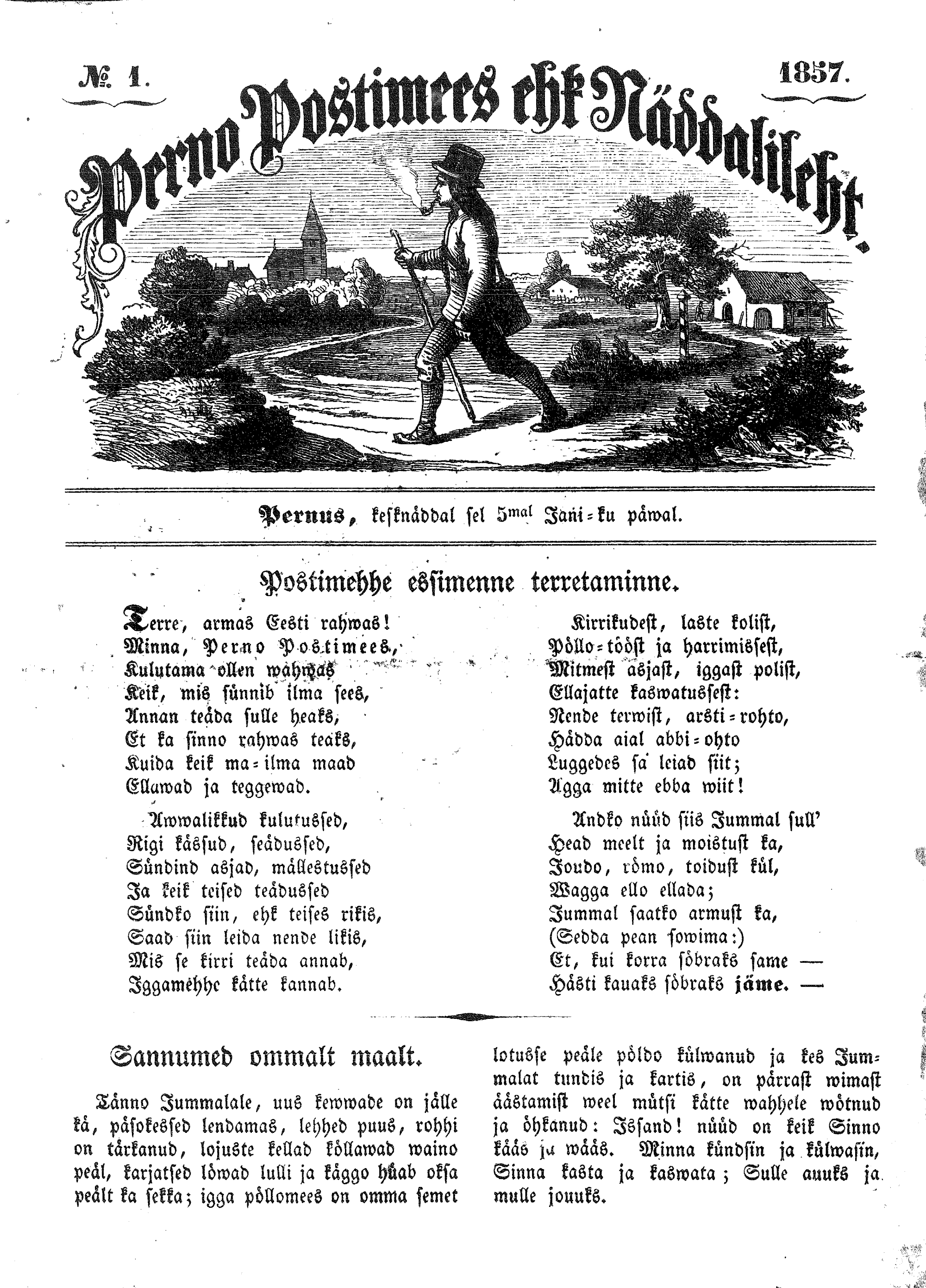
In 1857, the first Estonian weekly newspaper Perno Postimees began to be published in Pärnu.

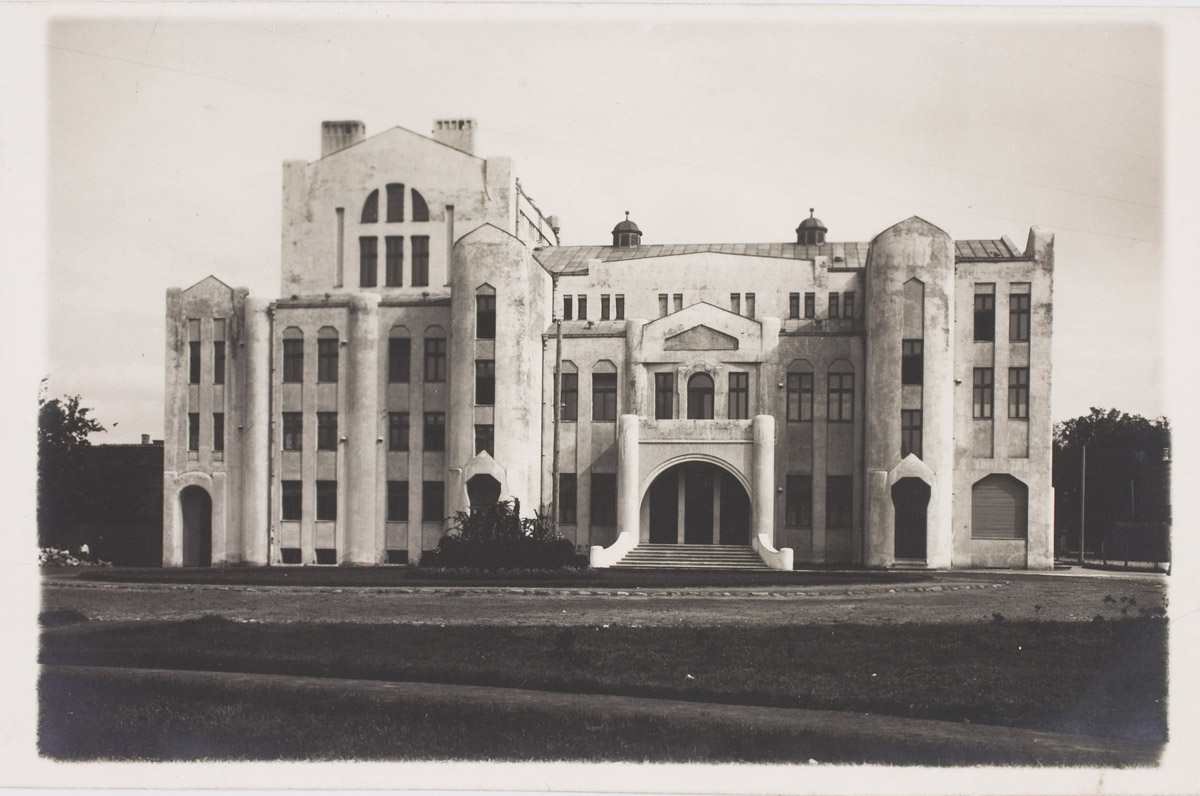
The building of the Endla Theatre, where the Estonian independence was first proclaimed on 23 February 1918.

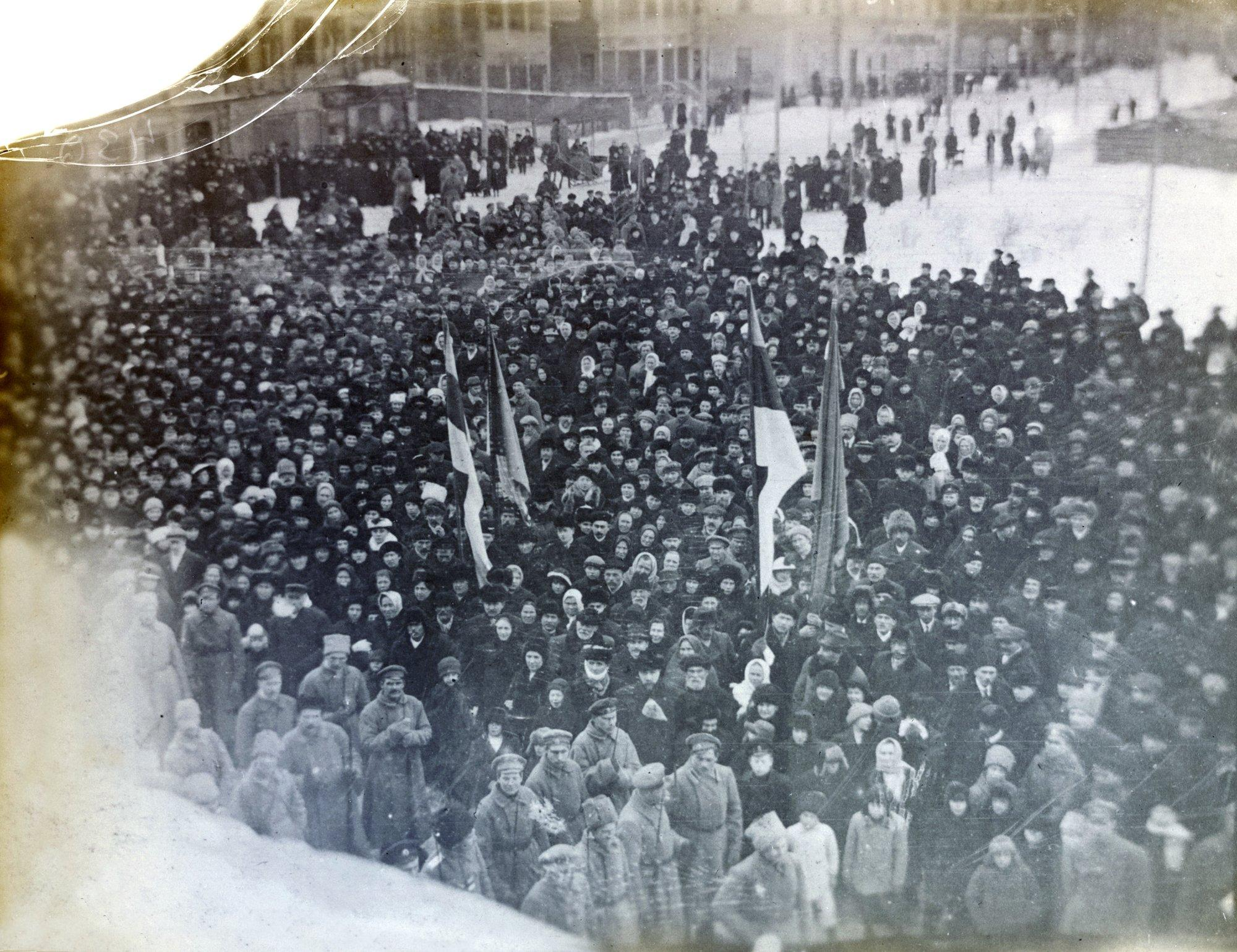
Crowd gathering in front of the Endla Theatre to listen to the Estonian Declaration of Independence on 23 February 1918.

== See also ==
- Pärnu Leht

== Works cited ==
- Balcerek, Mariusz (2012). Wisner, Henryk; Kempa, Tomasz (eds.). Księstwo Kurlandii i Semigalii w wojnie Rzeczypospolitej ze Szwecją w latach 1600–1629 [The Duchy of Courland and Semigallia in the War between the Polish-Lithuanian Commonwealth and Sweden (1600–1629)] (in Polish). Poznań: Wydawnictwo Poznańskie. ISBN 9788371778261.
