= Johan Stiernhöök =

Swedish lawyer

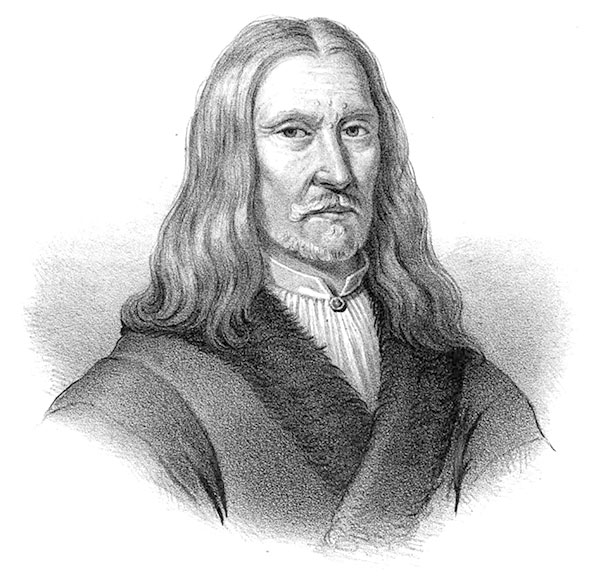
- Lithograph by Johan Cardon
- Born: 27 February 1596; Rättvik, Dalarna, Sweden
- Died: 25 July 1675 (aged 79); Stockholm, Sweden
- Occupation: Lawyer
- Parent(s): Olaus Petri Dalecarlus; Margareta Hansdotter
- Relatives: Petrus Olai Dalekarlus (brother); Johan Widekindi (nephew)

Johan Stiernhöök (27 February 1596 — 25 July 1675) was a Swedish lawyer. He has been called "the Swedish Justice father."

== Biography ==
Johan Stiernhook was the son of the chaplain in Rättvik, later vicar of Bro, Västmanland, Olaus Petri Dalecarlus (d. 1616) who signed the decision of the Uppsala meeting and was the brother of Pastor primarius, and Margareta Hansdotter. He took the name Johan Olai Dalecarlus. His sister Sara was the mother of historian Johan Widekindi and his brother Peter Olai Dalekarlus was Dean of Västerås and a member of parliament. Since Johan Stiernhook lost their parents, he could only through a relative's assistance in Arboga able to continue his studies in Västerås. The unusual diligence and vast knowledge, he was, though he was not a student, staff member collega Scholae in Arboga, and when he incurred the newly appointed Bishop John Rudbeckius 'attention, he obtained in 1619 through its agency of funds to study at Uppsala University. On the bishop's preface he also received the same year a scholarship and free travel by Axel Oxenstierna to Germany, where he studied at the universities of Leipzig, Jena, Wittenberg, and Rostock .
