= Assault on Düna Redoubt =

Part of the Polish–Swedish War of 1617–1618

- Part of the Polish–Swedish War (1617–1618)
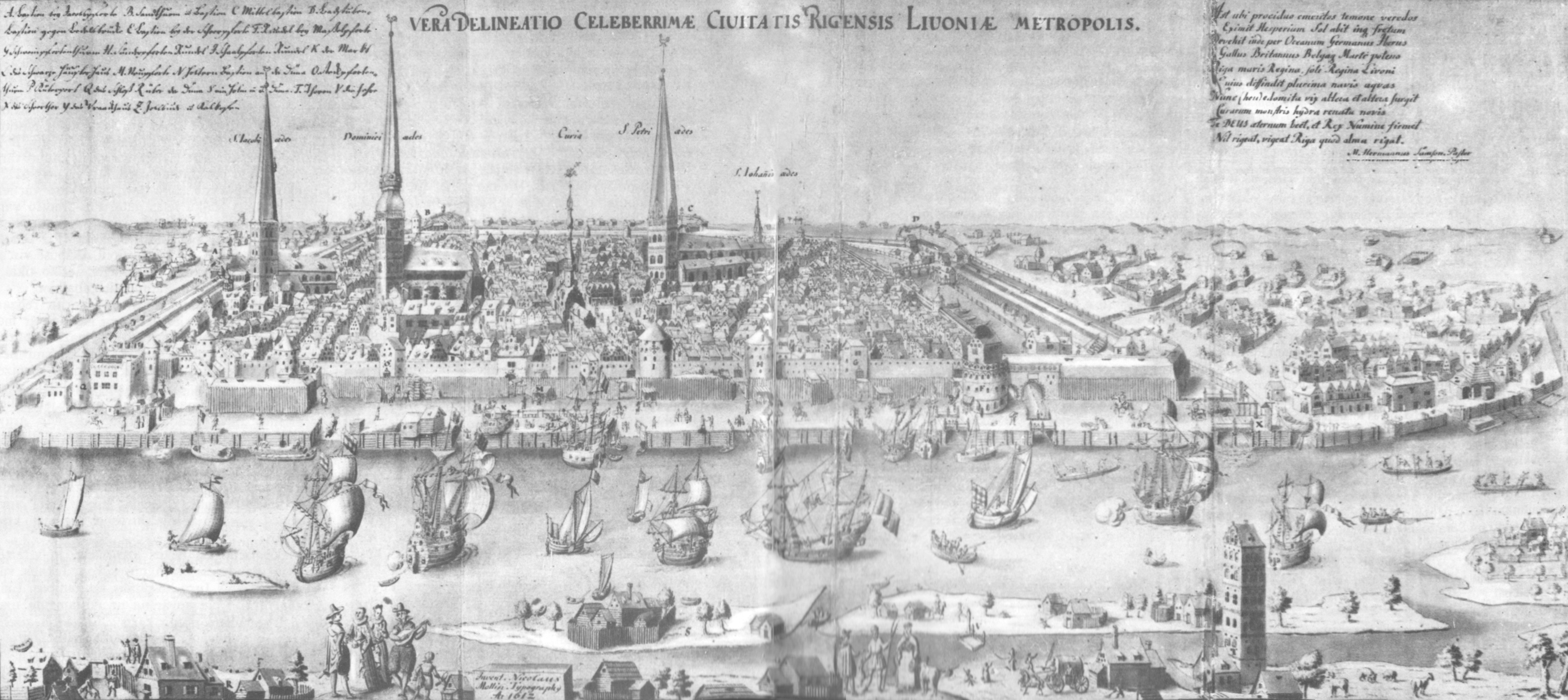
- Panorama of Riga in 1612 by Heinrich Thum
Date	23 July 1617
Location	Düna redoubt, outside Riga, Polish–Lithuanian Commonwealth (present-day Latvia) 56°56′56″N 24°6′23″E
Result	Swedish victory
Territorial changes	Düna redoubt is captured by Swedish forces

Belligerents
(yes) Swedish Empire	Polish–Lithuanian Commonwealth

Commanders and leaders
(yes) Nils Stiernsköld	Disputed (Note: Exactly who commanded the redoubt is disputed. Johann Bodecker attests that it was Jakub Krystian Butler while Johan Widekindi attests that it was Ranchanut Hasse.) (surrendered)

Units involved
Unknown	Düna redoubt garrison

Strength
At least 200 men Unknown number of ships	c. 200 men Unknown number of ships

Casualties and losses
Unknown	Everyone surrendered

The assault on Düna Redoubt occurred on 23 July 1617 during the Polish–Swedish War of 1617–1618.

Following a Swedish landing near Dünamünde on 9/19 June 1617, Swedish forces under the command of Wolmar Farensbach captured several positions in Courland's interior. On 21 or 22 July, Swedish reinforcements in the form of 2,000 men led by Nils Stiernsköld arrived at Düna's estuary.

On 23 July, Swedish forces formed up outside Düna redoubt, which had a garrison of some 200 men. The garrison was initially supported by ships from Riga, but these ships withdrew following intervention by Swedish warships. After capturing an outwork, the Swedes began the construction of a camp, and the Swedes demanded that the garrison surrender. A request to postpone their answer for a day was refused, and it finally capitulated in the evening of the same day.

== Background ==
Following the conclusion of peace with both Denmark–Norway and the Tsardom of Russia in 1613 and 1617, respectively, Gustavus Adolphus set his sights on the Polish–Lithuanian Commonwealth. Taking advantage of Commonwealth forces being tied up with an Ottoman attack, Gustavus began drawing up a campaign plan with permission from the Riksdag to wage war.

=== Prelude ===
Nils Stiernsköld was given command of the Swedish expedition, and only enlisted troops were to be used as Gustavus Adolphus' army reforms had only recently begun. A regiment of 1,200 men was enlisted in the Dutch Republic, comprising six infantry companies. The exact size of the Swedish expeditionary force is disputed. Historian Michael Fredholm von Essen estimated it at 3,700 men, all infantry, while Mariusz Balcerek estimated the force at 2,500 men.

Secret arrangements were made with Wolmar Fahrensbach, who, in the winter of 1615–1616, offered to surrender Dünamünde to the Swedes.

On 9/19 (Note: 9 June 19 June) June, four Swedish warships with some 400 men on board anchored off Dünamünde's roadstead. Dünamünde surrendered two days later. As Farensbach awaited reinforcements from Sweden so he could take Riga, he decided to turn toward Courland in order to secure it from Polish attacks.

Having successfully captured Grobin and Pilten but failing to take Pernau, Farensbach returned to Courland. In late June and early July, Gustavus Adolphus presented his war plan to the Riksdag. It called for an army of 2,500 or 3,000 men under Nils Stiernsköld to be sent to Livonia. The army was reduced to 2,000 men as Sweden had to reinforce its fortifications in Estonia. These troops arrived in early July, finally reaching Düna's estuary on 21 or 22 July.

== Assault ==
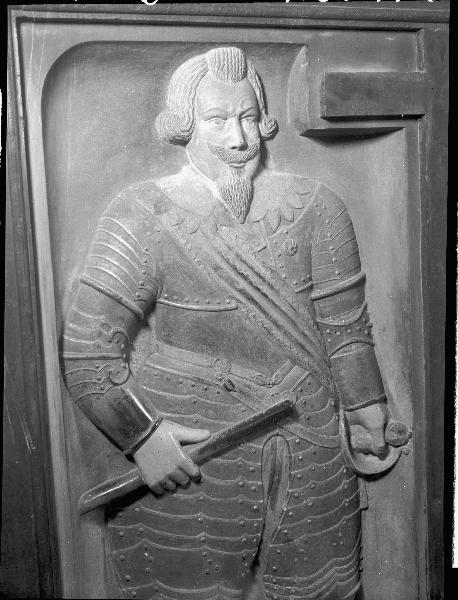
Photograph of Stiernsköld's tomb in Gillberga church by Iwar Anderson

Apart from Dünamünde, Düna's estuary was also defended by Düna redoubt, (Note: Classified as a sconce in Swedish sources) situated around a mile north of Riga. Capturing the redoubt was Stiernsköld's first objective, and he had his troops form up for an assault on 23 July.

Exactly who commanded the redoubt is disputed. According to Johann Bodecker, Jakub Krystian Butler commanded the redoubt, while Johan Widekindi attested that it was commanded by Ranchanut Hasse. In Polska kriget, a volume in the series Sveriges krig 1611–1632 by the Swedish General Staff, it is suggested that Hasse may have been Butler's "closest man". Mariusz Balcerek supports the position that Butler commanded the redoubt.

In total, the garrison amounted to some 200 men from Riga's garrison. Initially, ships from Riga assisted the redoubt, but the ships withdrew following intervention from Swedish vessels. The Swedish assault began with 200 musketeers storming an outwork, under bombardment from both the ships and the redoubt. Once it was captured, the Swedes began the construction of a camp there.

Stiernsköld now demanded the surrender of the garrison. A request from the garrison to postpone their answer for a day was refused, as it would have allowed the garrison to receive reinforcements from Riga. Following this, the Swedes gathered brushwood for gabions and began digging siege trenches. Additionally, earthworks were constructed to cut off the redoubt from Riga. In the evening, the redoubt finally capitulated to the Swedes. Balcerek attributes this to Butler "losing his nerve".

== Aftermath ==
The capture of the redoubt caused concern in Riga, and the inhabitants believed the Swedes would continue toward the city. Instead of assaulting the city, Stiernsköld asked for the city to place itself under Farensbach's protection, but this was refused. According to historian Michael Roberts, had Stiernsköld assaulted the city, it is possible that he could have captured it. However, Mariusz Balcerek disagrees, believing that such an assault would have led to heavy casualties and that the chances of capturing it were slim.

However, no such attack came, and instead, Stiernsköld captured and burned Neuermühlen on 24 July. He then continued toward Pernau to capture it at the request of Farensbach.

== See also ==
- Siege of Riga (1621) – Part of the Polish–Swedish War of 1621–1625
