= Petrus Olai Dalekarlus =

Swedish academic and politician

- Born: 28 February 1601; Rättvik, Dalarna, Sweden
- Died: 27 April 1680 (aged 79); Västerås, Sweden
- Occupations: Dean, Riksdagsman
- Parent(s): Olaus Petri Dalecarlus; Margareta Hansdotter
- Relatives: Johan Stiernhöök (brother); Johan Widekindi (nephew)

Petrus Olai Dalekarlus (28 February 1601 — 27 April 1680) was a Swedish academic, Dean and Member of Parliament (riksdagsman).

== Biography ==
Petrus Olai Dalekarlus was born on 28 February 1601 in Rättvik, the son of one of the signatories to the decision of the Uppsala meeting, Olaus Petri Hedemorensis. He was a brother of Johan Stiernhöök, a lawyer. He was a student at Arboga School for 12 years. In 1628, he was enrolled at Uppsala University, in 1633 becoming the Rector of Arboga. He traveled to foreign universities around 1638, returning in 1639 to be promoted to masters, and then took office as principal of Västerås School and Associate Professor in Logic. When he became a lecturer in theology in 1642, he received Hubbo in prebende. In 1648, he was appointed a curator in the Stora Skedvi parish, but returned to Västerås, already authorized in 1650, by the Queen to pastors and contractors. He later became Dean in Västerås. He died on 27 April 1680 in Västerås.

Dalekarlus was married to Karin Blackstadius, a daughter of Laurentius Nicolai Blackstadius. Their children adopted the name Aroselius. One of the sons was Laurentius Petri Aroselius, and one daughter was married to Samuel Laurentii Höijer.
