= Johan Widekindi =

Swedish historian (c.1619 - 1675)

- Born: c 1619; Västmanland, Sweden
- Died: 24 December 1675; Sweden
- Occupation: Historian
- Parent(s): Widichinnus Laurentii; Sara Olofsdotter
- Relatives: Johan Stiernhöök (uncle); Petrus Olai Dalekarlus (uncle)

Johan Widekindi (c. 1619 – 24 December 1675) was a Swedish historian and academic.

== Biography ==
Widekindi was born between 1618 and 1620 to a priestly family. His father was Widich Larsson (Latin: Widichinnus Laurentii), a vicar in Bro, Västmanland. His mother was Sara Olofsdotter, a sister of Johan Stiernhöök. His brothers took the name Pontelius after their birthplace.

He was a student at Uppsala University in 1640 and also lectured there as a Latin orator. After a trip abroad, he was hired in 1655 as eloquentiæ lecturer at Stockholm High School, and almost at the same time he was given the task of organizing Axel Oxenstierna libraries and archives. A wealth of documents from the 16th and 17th centuries attracted Widekindi to historical writings, and began a work to write a history of events between Poland and Sweden from the time of John III to his own time.

This project was given approval by Charles X after he presented it in Copenhagen in 1659 and again in Gothenburg for further deliberation, but the king's death left Widekindi without help. He soon found a patron in Chancellor Magnus Gabriel De la Gardie, which among other things provided him power of attorney. Sweden then had three historiographers, namely Bogislaus Philipp von Chemnitz, Johannes Loccenius, and Widekindi himself. After being granted any historical tables, Lumen chronographicum (1664–66), he seized undertake to, at the pleasure of the Chancellor, depicting Jacob De la Gardie "commendable actioner in Muscovite War", but produced at the same time (November 1666) the desire to write the history of Sweden from Gustav Vasa's death and continuera Seriem rerum, "unto our time." On October 28, 1668 was given him the royal command to write a complete history of the "gustavianske Vasa kings" to Gustavus Adolphus's German expedition.

== See also ==
- Svenskt biografiskt handlexikon
