= Second assault on Pernau =

Part of the Polish–Swedish War of 1617–1618

Second Assault on Pernau
- Part of the Polish–Swedish War (1617–1618)
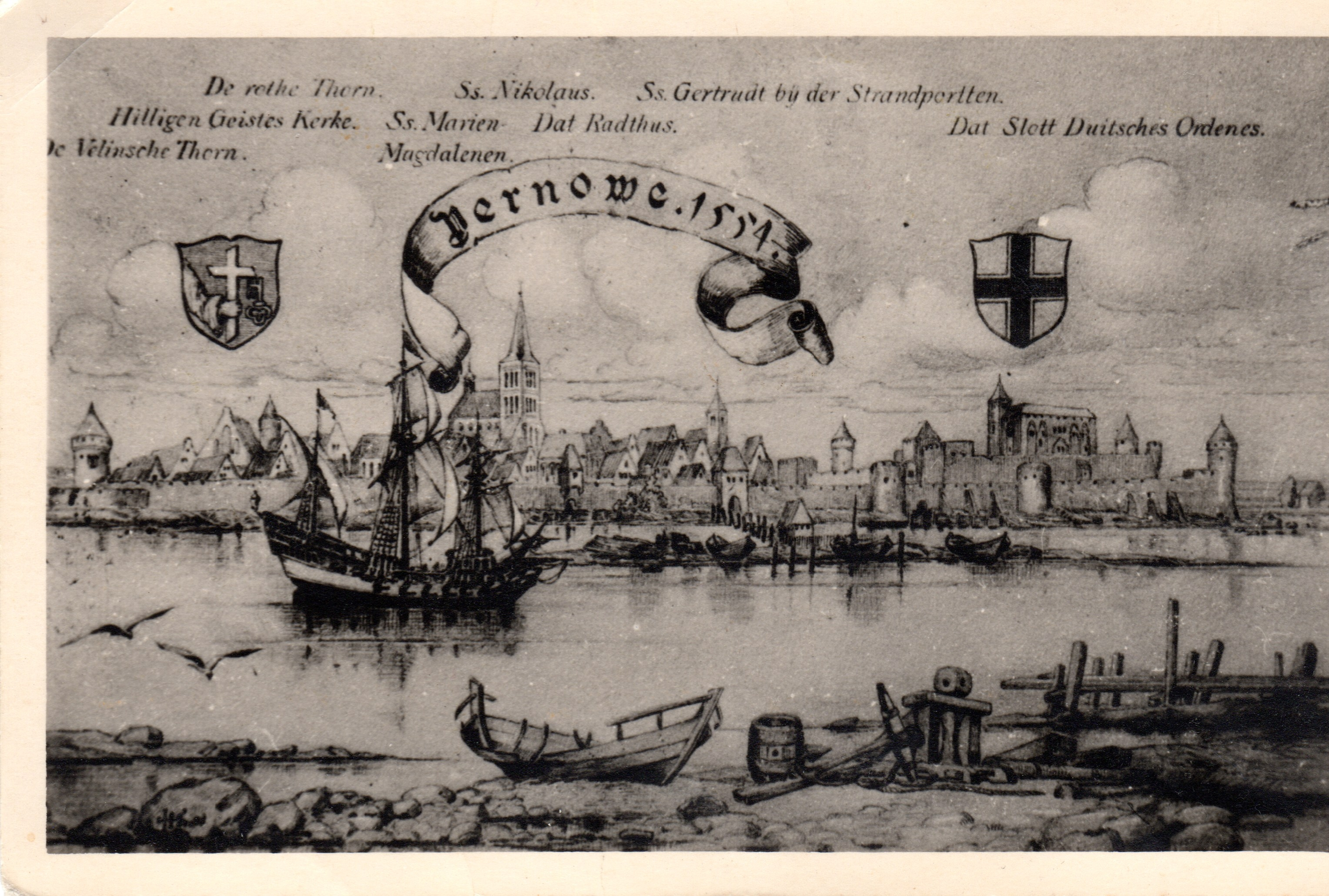
- Drawing of Pernau in 1554 by an unknown author
Date	4–7 August 1617 (O.S.); 14–17 August 1617 (N.S.)
Location	Pernau, Livonia (present-day Estonia) 58°23′N 24°30′E
Result	Swedish-Courlandish victory
Territorial changes	Pernau is captured by Swedish-Courlandish forces

Belligerents
(yes) Swedish Empire; Duchy of Courland	Polish–Lithuanian Commonwealth

Commanders and leaders
(yes) Nils Stiernsköld; Wolmar Fahrensbach (yes) Kristofer Mannersköld	Andrzej Snarski (surrendered)

Units involved
(yes) Kristofer Mannersköld's company	Pernau garrison

Strength
(yes) 900 men 200–300 men (yes) 6 guns	c. 400 men

Casualties and losses
c. 60 killed 1 wounded 1 gun destroyed	Unknown

The second assault on Pernau occurred from 4/14 to 7/17 August 1617 during the Polish–Swedish War of 1617–1618.

Following a successful Swedish landing at the roadstead of Dünamünde fortress on 9/19 June, Swedish forces quickly took control of Dünamünde. While waiting for reinforcements, Wolmar Fahrensbach, the former commander of Dünamünde who had defected to Sweden, turned toward Courland. After having seized multiple fortresses in Courland, he made a failed attempt to capture Pernau.

In August, after convincing Nils Stiernsköld to attack Pernau once again, Swedish-Courlandish forces sailed to the fortress, immediately coming into combat with the garrison. A battery constructed by the Swedes was destroyed, but when reinforcements arrived under the command of Kristofer Mannersköld, Pernau capitulated soon after.

== Background ==
Following the conclusion of peace with both Denmark–Norway and the Tsardom of Russia in 1613 and 1617, respectively, Gustavus Adolphus set his sights on the Polish–Lithuanian Commonwealth. Taking advantage of Commonwealth forces being tied up with an Ottoman attack, Gustavus began drawing up a campaign plan with permission from the Riksdag to wage war.

=== Prelude ===
Nils Stiernsköld was given command of the Swedish expedition, and only enlisted troops were to be used as Gustavus Adolphus' army reforms had only recently begun. A regiment of 1,200 men was enlisted in the Dutch Republic, comprising six infantry companies. The exact size of the Swedish expeditionary force is disputed. Historian Michael Fredholm von Essen estimated it at 3,700 men, all infantry, while Mariusz Balcerek estimated the force at 2,500 men.

Secret arrangements were made with Wolmar Fahrensbach, who, in the winter of 1615–1616, offered to surrender Dünamünde to the Swedes.

On 9/19 (Note: 9 June 19 June) June, four Swedish warships with some 400 men on board anchored off Dünamünde's roadstead. Dünamünde surrendered two days later. As Farensbach awaited reinforcements from Sweden so he could take Riga, he turned toward Courland in order to secure it from Polish attacks.

After having seized and garrisoned multiple fortresses in Courland, Farensbach moved toward northern Livonia in July to capture the important port and seat of the Parnawa Voivodeship, Pernau. This attack failed, however, and he returned to Courland.

Following a successful assault on Düna Redoubt, Farensbach convinced Nils Stiernsköld to attack Pernau.

== Assault ==
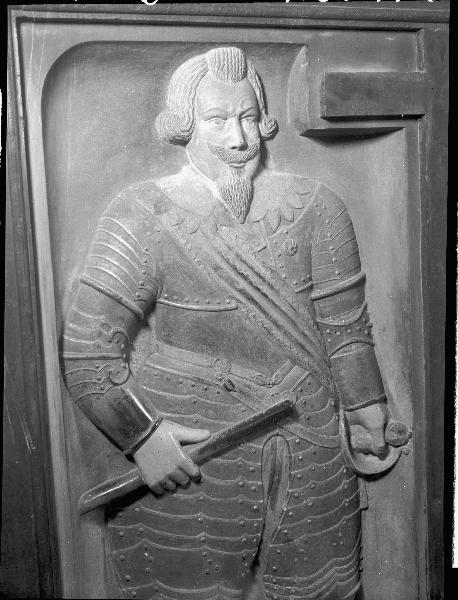
Photograph of Stiernsköld's tomb in Gillberga church by Iwar Anderson

Following Farensbach's advice to attack Pernau, Stiernsköld marched toward Pernau with some 900 Swedish troops and 200–300 Courlandish troops under the command of Farensbach. Additionally. they had six artillery pieces at their disposal, and part of the Swedish fleet. They reached Pernau following two days of sailing.

Pernau's garrison consisted of some 400 men, commanded by Andrzej Snarski. Pernau had powerful defenses and a large supply of ammunition. The garrison immediately fought the Swedish-Courlandish troops as soon as they landed, due to having become more vigilant following the failed attack in July. However, an artillery battery was constructed by the Swedes from 4/14 to 5/15 August, placing two guns inside. The battery was destroyed, alongside one gun the following day, as it was poorly positioned. During the destruction, Swedish engineer Antony Monier was wounded.

Soon after, reinforcements consisting of Kristofer Assersson Mannersköld's company arrived. These troops, which were more experienced than Stiernsköld's men, built a new battery fitted with five guns that the garrison could not destroy. Additionally, the Swedes began digging tunnels. Two days later, the garrison capitulated following negotiations, which stipulated that the garrison be allowed to remain for one day before it departed.

== Aftermath ==
After the garrison departed, four companies from Stiernsköld's forces formed the new garrison. In total, the Swedish-Courlandish forces lost around 60 men. Salis had been captured alongside Pernau as well.

As a result of Pernau and Salis being captured by the Swedes, the ability for Commonwealth forces to attack Estonia along the coast had been significantly hampered. The capitulation of Pernau was interpreted as treasonous. Suspicion fell upon Mikołaj Wilczkowski, among others, as Wilczkowski was expected to go to Pernau with 100 men.

== See also ==
- Assault on Düna Redoubt – Part of the Polish–Swedish War of 1617–1618
