= Ilmi Kolla =

Estonian poet

Ilmi Kolla (4 April 1933 Pärnu – 18 December 1954 Tallinn) was an Estonian poet.

In 1950, she become a member of the Pärnu department of the Young Authors' Association. In 1952, she worked on the editorial board of the youth newspaper Säde.

She died in 1954 because of tuberculosis. She is buried at Surju Cemetery.

Her poetry collections were published posthumously. Several of her poems were set to music.

== Works ==
- 1957: poetry collection "Luuletused"
- 1983: poetry collection "Minu kevad"
- 2009: poetry collection "Kõik mu laulud" (compiled by Eve Annuk)
