= First assault on Pernau =

Part of the Polish–Swedish War of 1617–1618

First Assault on Pernau
- Part of the Polish–Swedish War (1617–1618)
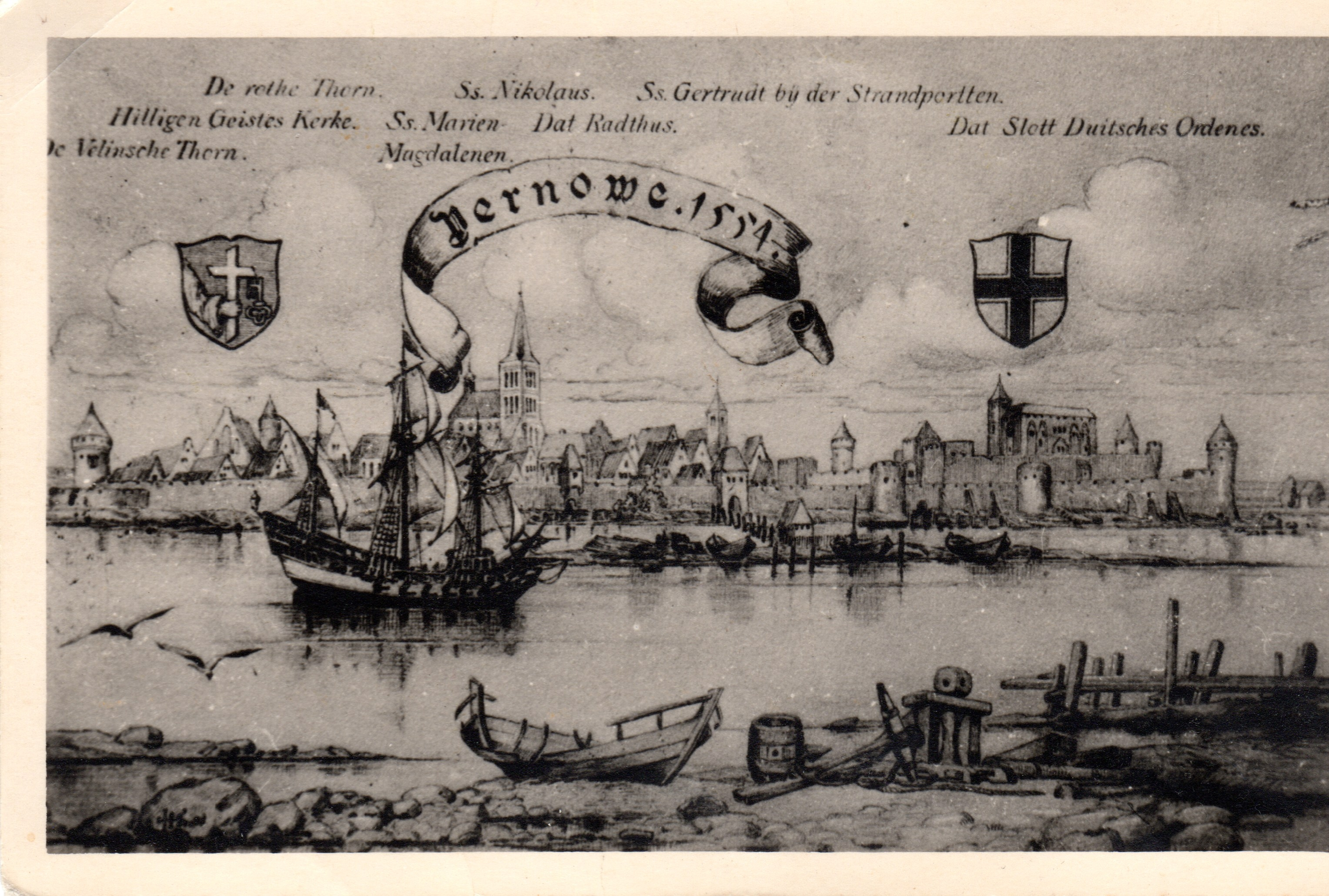
- Drawing of Pernau in 1554 by an unknown author
Date	4–6 July 1617 (O.S.); 14–16 July 1617 (N.S.)
Location	Pernau, Livonia (present-day Estonia) 58°23′N 24°30′E
Result	Polish–Lithuanian victory

Belligerents
Polish–Lithuanian Commonwealth	(yes) Swedish Empire; Duchy of Courland

Commanders and leaders
Andrzej Snarski	(yes) Wolmar Fahrensbach

Units involved
Pernau garrison	Unknown

Strength
Small (Note: Some accounts estimate it at only seven hajduks, though these are likely exaggerated. The garrison was also reinforced with twenty knights during the fighting.)	Unknown number of men Three ships

Casualties and losses
Unknown	Unknown

The first assault on Pernau occurred from 4/14 to 6/16 June 1617 during the Polish–Swedish War of 1617–1618.

Following a successful Swedish landing at Dünamünde's roadstead on 9/19 June, Swedish forces quickly took control of Dünamünde. While waiting for reinforcements, Wolmar Fahrensbach, the former commander of Dünamünde who had defected to Sweden, turned toward Courland. After having seized multiple fortresses in Courland, Farensbach turned to northern Livonia, intending to capture Pernau.

On 4/14 June, Swedish forces arrived off Pernau on three ships and immediately assaulted the fortress. However, it ended in failure. It was continuously assaulted throughout the night to no avail, at which point Farensbach wished to blockade and besiege it. However, the fortress's defenses were partially repaired, and the final Swedish assault on 6/16 June failed, causing the Swedes to withdraw.

== Background ==
Following the conclusion of peace with both Denmark–Norway and the Tsardom of Russia in 1613 and 1617, respectively, Gustavus Adolphus set his sights on the Polish–Lithuanian Commonwealth. Taking advantage of Commonwealth forces being tied up with an Ottoman attack, Gustavus began drawing up a campaign plan with permission from the Riksdag to wage war.

=== Prelude ===
Nils Stiernsköld was given command of the Swedish expedition, and only enlisted troops were to be used as Gustavus Adolphus' army reforms had only recently begun. A regiment of 1,200 men was enlisted in the Dutch Republic, comprising six infantry companies. The exact size of the Swedish expeditionary force is disputed. Historian Michael Fredholm von Essen estimated it at 3,700 men, all infantry, while Mariusz Balcerek estimated the force at 2,500 men.

Secret arrangements were made with Wolmar Fahrensbach, who, in the winter of 1615–1616, offered to surrender Dünamünde to the Swedes.

On 9/19 (Note: 9 June 19 June) June, four Swedish warships with some 400 men on board anchored off Dünamünde's roadstead. Dünamünde surrendered two days later. As Farensbach awaited reinforcements from Sweden so he could take Riga, he turned toward Courland in order to secure it from Polish attacks.

After having seized and garrisoned multiple fortresses in Courland, Farensbach moved toward northern Livonia to capture the important port and seat of the Parnawa Voivodeship, Pernau.

== Assault ==
On 4/14 July, a Friday, Farensbach arrived in Pernau with three ships intending to surprise it. The fortress had a small garrison. Some accounts estimate it at seven hajduks, though these are likely exaggerated.

He immediately launched an assault on the fortress at 11:00 p.m. However, the assault failed. Throughout the night, the Swedes continuously assaulted the fortress, but to no avail. Instead, Farensbach attempted to blockade and besiege the fortress. Nevertheless, the fortifications were partially repaired by the garrison, and twenty knights were brought into the fortress by Andrzej Snarski. The final Swedish assault on 6/16 July (Note: It occurred on Sunday) ended in failure, and they withdrew from the fortress.

== Aftermath ==
The only result of the expedition to Pernau was that its suburbs and cathedral were destroyed. Following the failed assault, Farensbach returned to Courland. The assault was the first independent military operation against the Commonwealth by Courland.

Due to Farensbach's difficulties, Gustavus Adolphus planned to send reinforcements in the form of 2,500 to 3,000 men, though this was reduced to 2,000 men. Command of these reinforcements was given to Nils Stiernsköld. In August, Swedish forces returned to Pernau, capturing it on 8 August.

== See also ==
- Assault on Düna Redoubt – Part of the Polish–Swedish War of 1617–1618
