= Per Nyström =

Swedish historian, publicist, Social Democrat and governor

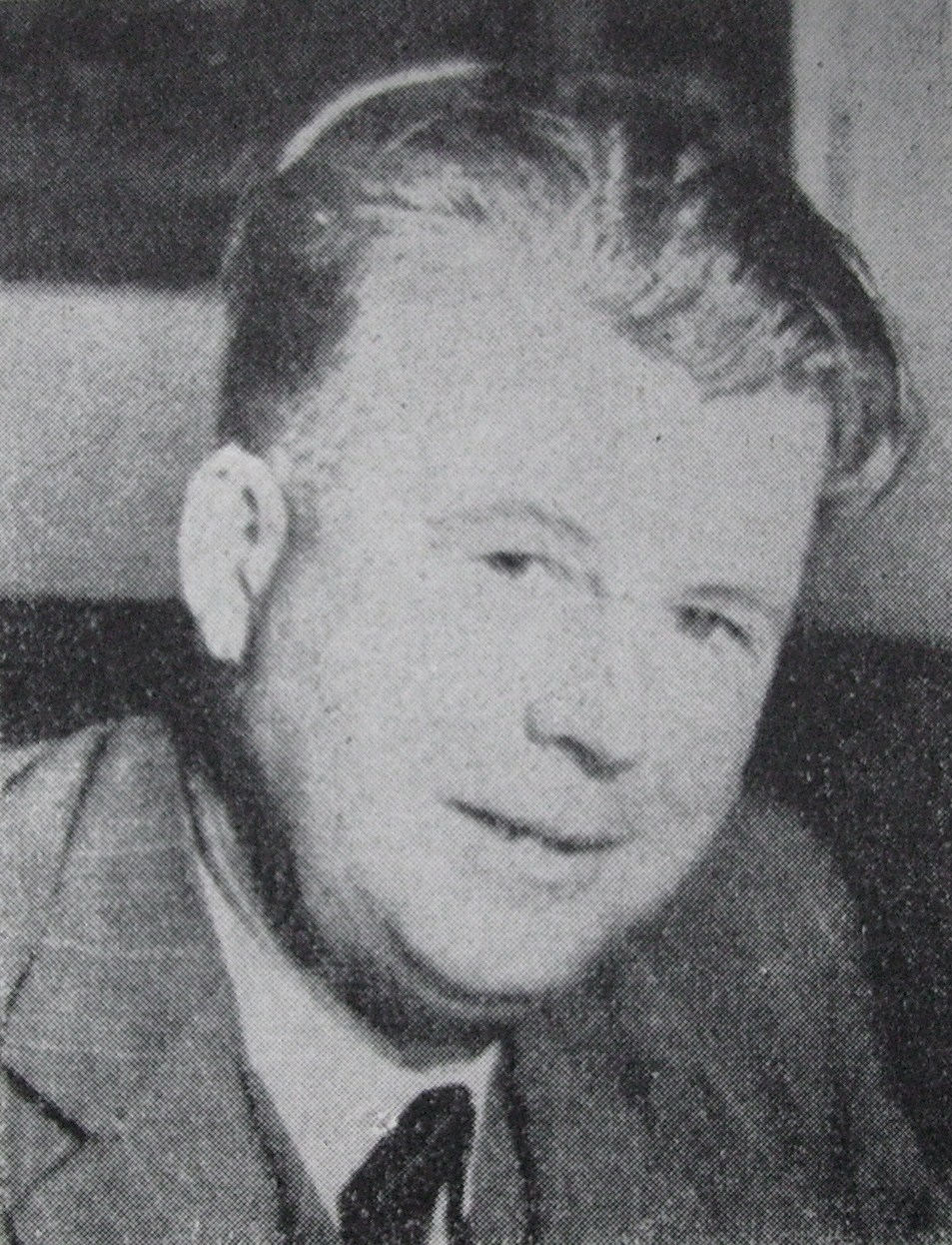

Per Nyström (21 November 1903 – 3 October 1993) was a Swedish historian, publicist, Social Democrat and governor of Gothenburg and Bohus County 1950–1971.
