= Polish–Swedish War (1617–1618) =

Phase of the Polish-Swedish war

- Part of the Polish–Swedish War (1600–1629)
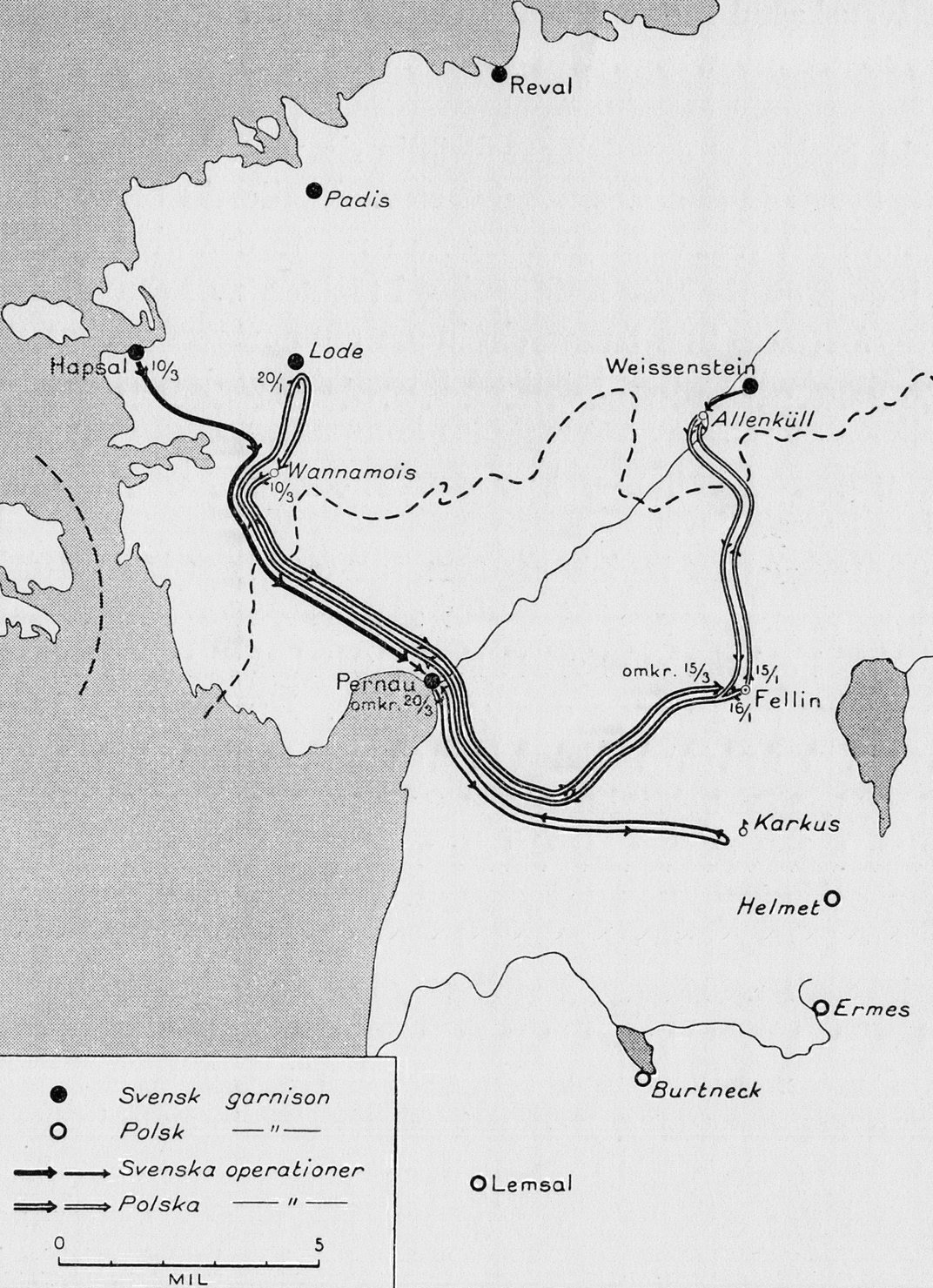
- Troop movements on both sides during the war
Date	1617–1618
Location	Livonia, Estonia
Result	Swedish victory
Territorial changes	City of Pärnu ceded to Sweden for 2 years

Belligerents
(yes) Swedish Empire; Duchy of Courland	Polish–Lithuanian Commonwealth

Commanders and leaders
(yes) Gustavus Adolphus (yes) Nils Stiernsköld; Wolmar Fahrensbach	Krzysztof Radziwiłł; Jan Siciński

The Polish–Swedish War (1617–1618) was a phase of the longer Polish–Swedish War of 1600–1629. It continued the war of 1600–1611 and was an attempt by Sweden to take Polish pressure off Russia. The Polish–Lithuanian Commonwealth was then also fighting Tartars and (on the southern front) the Ottoman Empire. Russia and Sweden were at that stage allied, prior to the Ingrian War, part of Russia's Time of Troubles. The 1617–1618 war's cause was a dispute over Livonia and Estonia, and a dispute between Sigismund III Vasa and Gustavus Adolphus over the Swedish throne.

== Background ==
After the death of Charles IX of Sweden, Sweden was ruled by his teenage son, Gustavus Adolphus. The young monarch was supported by influential Chancellor Axel Oxenstierna, who in April 1612 agreed to prolong the truce with the Commonwealth until September 1616. At the same time, Polish king Sigismund III Vasa did not renounce the Swedish crown (see Polish–Swedish union), and plotted against Gustavus Adolphus, trying to win over Swedish nobility. Sigismund even considered another campaign in Sweden, but failed to do so, due to the ongoing war with Russia.

After lengthy negotiations, on 27 February 1617 Sweden and Russia signed the Treaty of Stolbovo, ending the Ingrian War. Gustavus Adolphus was now able to concentrate his efforts in Livonia. He was supported by other Protestant states, England and Holland.

== War ==
On 19 June 1617, four months after the Treaty of Stolbovo, a Swedish naval squadron of four ships entered the Gulf of Riga and anchored at Dyjament/Dunamunde. The fortress was defended by weak Polish–Lithuanian forces under the starosta of Rūjiena, Wolmar Farensbach, who capitulated after a two-day siege and joined the invaders. The Swedish fleet blocked Riga, and in July, when reinforcements came, Swedes occupied almost the whole Livonian coast, from Grobiņa to Pärnu. Pärnu was assaulted by Swedish forces in July as well, though it failed. On 23 July, Düna Redoubt capitulated to Swedish forces. The city of Pärnu itself was attacked on 11 August and surrendered after a three-day siege. Salacgrīva was captured on 18 August, and by late summer the Swedish Empire controlled all of Livonia except for Riga.

Radziwiłł, who was the first in the history of the Polish-Lithuanian Commonwealth to use dragoons to fight, showed off his exceptional energy, determination and organizational talent, thanks to which the Lithuanians very quickly regained all the lost fortresses except Pärnu, which was too strongly fortified. After recovering most of its losses, the Lithuanian army entered Courland, which was behaving suspiciously. The Hetman wanted to annex the entire Courland to Lithuania, but Sigismund III Vasa did not agree to this and left complete control over the duchy to Frederick Kettler. Offended at the king, Radziwiłł resigned from the high command in Livonia and handed it over to Colonel Jan Siciński, who, with only 100 soldiers, moved to Estonia. Because the Swedes closed themselves in their fortresses and the Lithuanian army did not have enough infantry and artillery, hostilities ceased. The Swedes, realizing that despite the reforms, their army was not yet able to compete with the Lithuanian army, came forward with peace proposals

In September 1618, a truce between the Commonwealth and Sweden was signed. The Polish–Lithuanian side demanded the return of Pärnu, but since the war between the Commonwealth and Muscovy continued, Sigismund argued successfully that the city would temporarily remain in Swedish hands. The truce was valid for two years, expiring in November 1620. The war ended in a Swedish victory.

== Bibliography ==
- Leszek Podhorodecki, Rapier i koncerz, Warszawa 1985, ISBN 83-05-11452-X, str. 119–122
- Henryk Wisner: Zygmunt III Waza. Wroclaw: Zaklad Narodowy im. Ossolinskich – Wydawnictwo, 2006, s. 199–202. ISBN 978-83-04-04801-0.
- Steward Oakley, 1993, War and peace in the Baltic, 1560–1790, New York: Routledge. ISBN 0-415-02472-2
- Phillips, Charles; Axelrod, Alan (2005). Encyclopedia of Wars. Facts On File. ISBN 9781438110301.
- Generalstaben (1936). Sveriges krig, 1611–1632 [Sweden's wars: 1611–1632] (in Swedish). Vol. 2. Generalstaben.
- Balcerek, Mariusz (2012). Wisner, Henryk; Kempa, Tomasz (eds.). Księstwo Kurlandii i Semigalii w wojnie Rzeczypospolitej ze Szwecją w latach 1600–1629 [The Duchy of Courland and Semigallia in the War between the Polish-Lithuanian Commonwealth and Sweden (1600–1629)] (in Polish). Poznań: Wydawnictwo Poznańskie. ISBN 9788371778261.
