= Uexküll =

Baltic German noble family

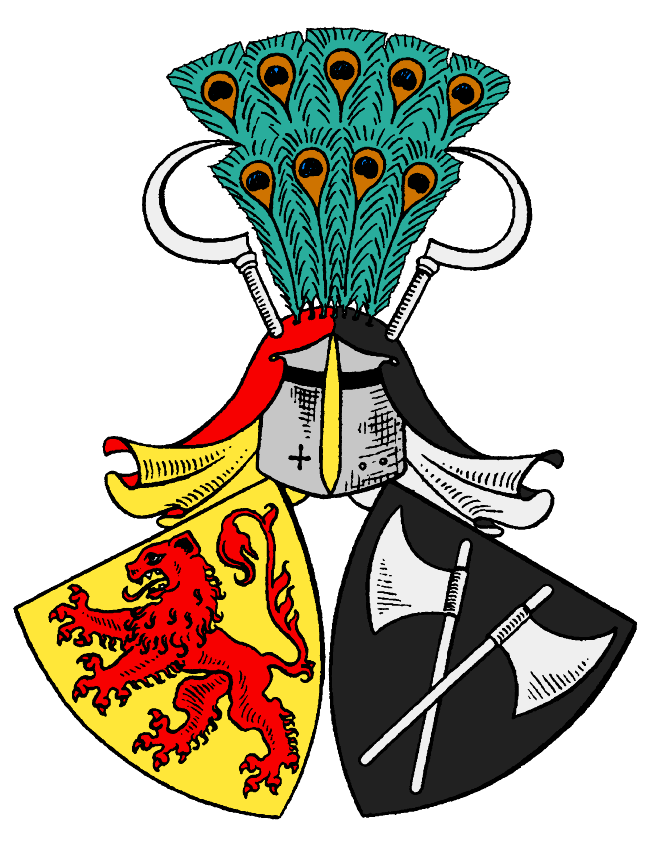
Coat of arms of Uexküll family since 1475

The Uexküll family (also Üxküll or Yxkull) is an old and distinguished Baltic German noble family, which derived its name from the town of Uexküll, today Ikšķile in Latvia.

== History ==
Uexküll was originally a Bremen noble family von Bardewisch, first appeared in written documents on 26 July 1229, whose lineage can be traced to several places, the earliest originating in Stedingen, and later Old Livonia (modern Estonia and Latvia), Sweden, Württemberg, and Baden. After obtaining domain Meyendorff, the branch of Uexkülls family was formed in the third quarter of the 15th century and since then it became known as Meyendorff von Uexküll. The family was also part of the German nobility and on 9 October 1790 they were awarded with the title of Imperial Count by Leopold II.

== Coat of arms ==
=== Bardewisch ===
The Bardewisch coat of arms displays two upward facing battle axes, in blue and black. The helmet appears with closed blue-silver covers.

=== Uexküll ===
The Uexküll coat of arms displays a victorious red lion in a golden backdrop. On the two helmets are red-golden covers facing silver sickles with red shanks. These are adorned with natural peacock feathers.

=== Coat of arms since 1475 ===
Since 1475 the coat of arms has shown the shields of both the Bardewisch and Uexküll. This is achieved by placing the two side by side with the Uexküll shield on the left and the Bardewisch shield to the right. The helmet, adorned with peacock feathers and centered between two sickles, is split in two, the left of the helmet displaying the red and gold of Uexküll, and the right the colours of Bardewisch.

== Notable members ==
- Alexander Rudolf Karl von Uexküll (1829–1891), politician, mayor of Reval (1878–1883)
- Alexandrine Gräfin von Üxküll-Gyllenband (1873–1963), Matron within the German Red Cross
- August Heinrich Friedrich von Uexküll-Gyllenband (1765–1822), Chamberlain, Government Councillor, Court Councilor in Stuttgart
- Berend Johann von Uexküll (1671–1676), Captain within the Estonian Knighthood
- Berend Johann von Uexküll (1806–1809), Captain within the Estonian Knighthood
- Bernhard Graf Uxkull-Gyllenband (1899–1918), German poet
- Friedrich Emich Johann von Uexküll-Gyllenband (1724–1810), District envoy, Minister of State, President of the Privy Council in Stuttgart
- Friedrich Johann Emich von Üxküll-Gyllenband (1684–1768), President of the Oberhof Council within the Margrave of Baden-Durlach
- Georg Detloff von Uexküll (1668–1710), Captain within the Estonian Knighthood
- Gertrud Schwend-Uexküll (1867–1901), women's rights activist and education pioneer
- Gösta von Uexküll (1909–1993), writer and journalist
- Jakob Johann von Uexkül (1864–1944), biologist, zoologist, and philosopher
- Jakob von Uexkull (born 1944), founder of Right Livelihood Award
- Johann von Uexküll (died 1583), Danish Governor of Ösel
- Karl Friedrich Emich von Uexküll-Gyllenband (1755–1832), art critic and collector in Württemberg
- Nikolaus von Üxküll-Gyllenband (1877–1944), businessman, and Colonel in the German Resistance
- Jens Ole von Uexkuell (born 1978), German fencer
- Ole von Uexküll (born 1978), Swedish activist
- Otto von Uexküll (died 1601), Swedish Field marshal
- Otto von Uexküll (died 1650), Captain within the Estonian Knighthood
- Thure von Uexküll (1908–2004), Doctor, scholar of psychosomatic medicine and biosemiotics
- Woldemar Graf Uxkull-Gyllenband (1898–1939), German historian
- Richard von Yxkull (born 1967), chairman of Hammarby Fotboll, one of Sweden's biggest football clubs
- Beata von Yxkull (1618–1667), Swedish noble and folklore character.

== See also ==
- Üksküla
