= Daugavgrīva fortress =

17th century fortifications near Riga, Latvia

- Near Riga in Latvia
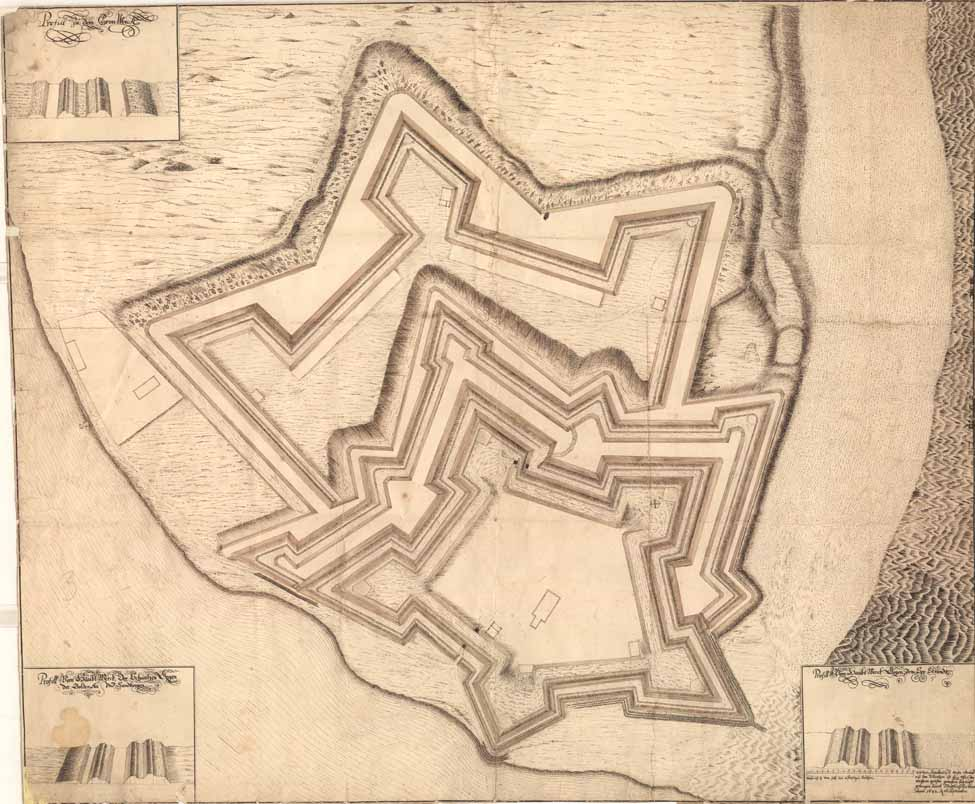
- Daugavgrīva fortress plan by Matthias Richter. 1642

Site information
- Type: fortress
- Open to the public: yes
- Condition: ruins

Location
- Location within Latvia
- Coordinates: 57°02′42″N 24°02′23″E

Site history
- Built: 1624
- Materials: dolomite

Daugavgrīva fortress (German: Dünamünder Schanze, Festung Dünamünde; Polish: twierdza Dynemunt; Russian: крепость Дюнамюнде, Усть-Двинск; Swedish: Neumünde) is a fortress built in Swedish Livonia in the 17th century. It is located in Daugavgrīva, Riga near the mouth of Buļļupe river branch in the Daugava.

Daugavgrīva fortress has a significant place in the history of Latvia. Bible translator Johann Ernst Glück was living here in 1680-1683, and during World War I the first unit of Latvian troops was established here — the 1st Daugavgrīva Latvian Riflemen Battalion (1915). During the Latvian War of Independence, in 1919, during the Bermontiade, the fortress was captured by the 9th Rēzekne Infantry Regiment of the Latvian Army.

Today the fort is a monument of national significance. Part of its territory is included in the customs territory of the Republic of Latvia.

== History ==
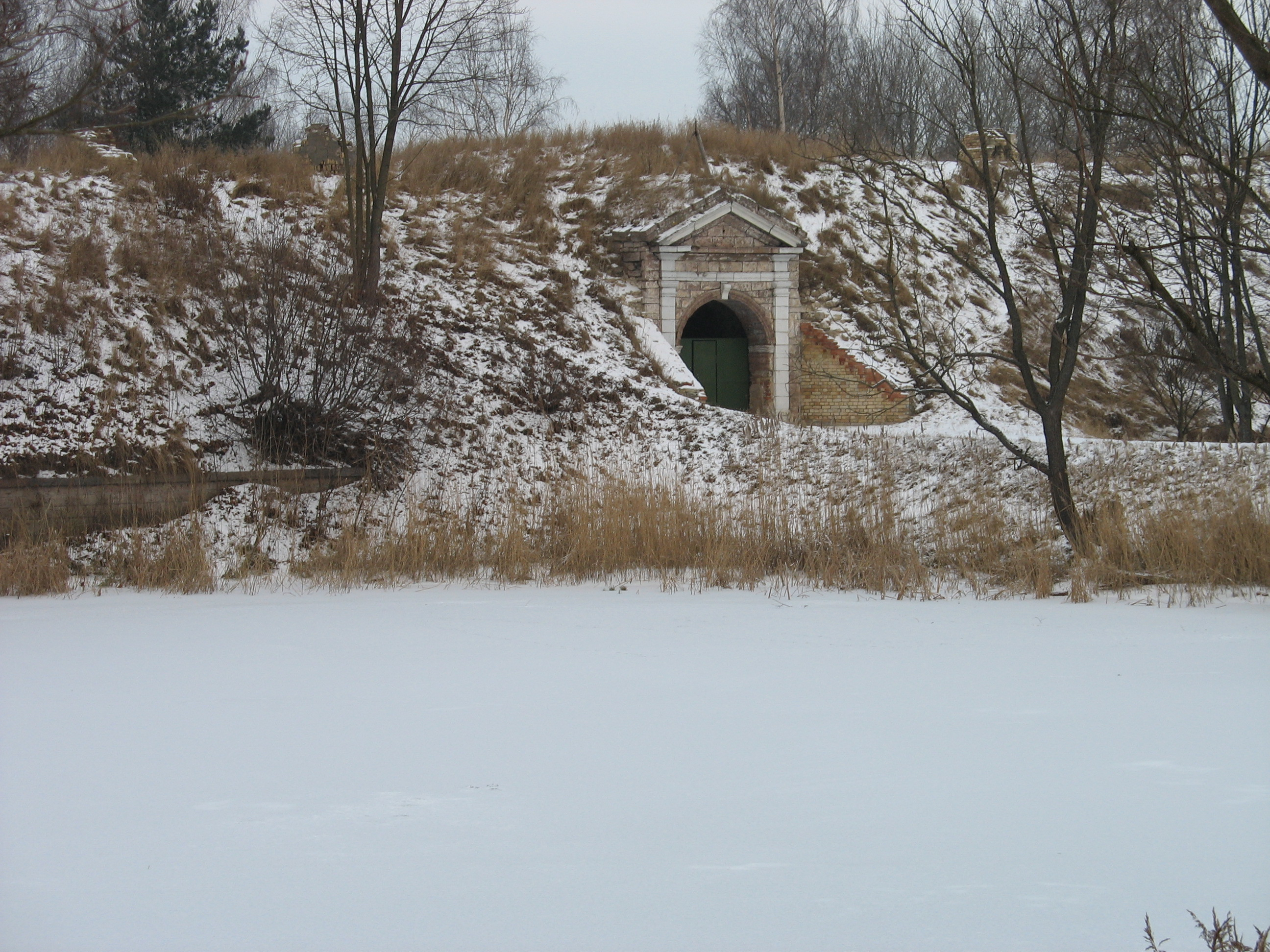
Entrance into Daugavgrīvas fortress.

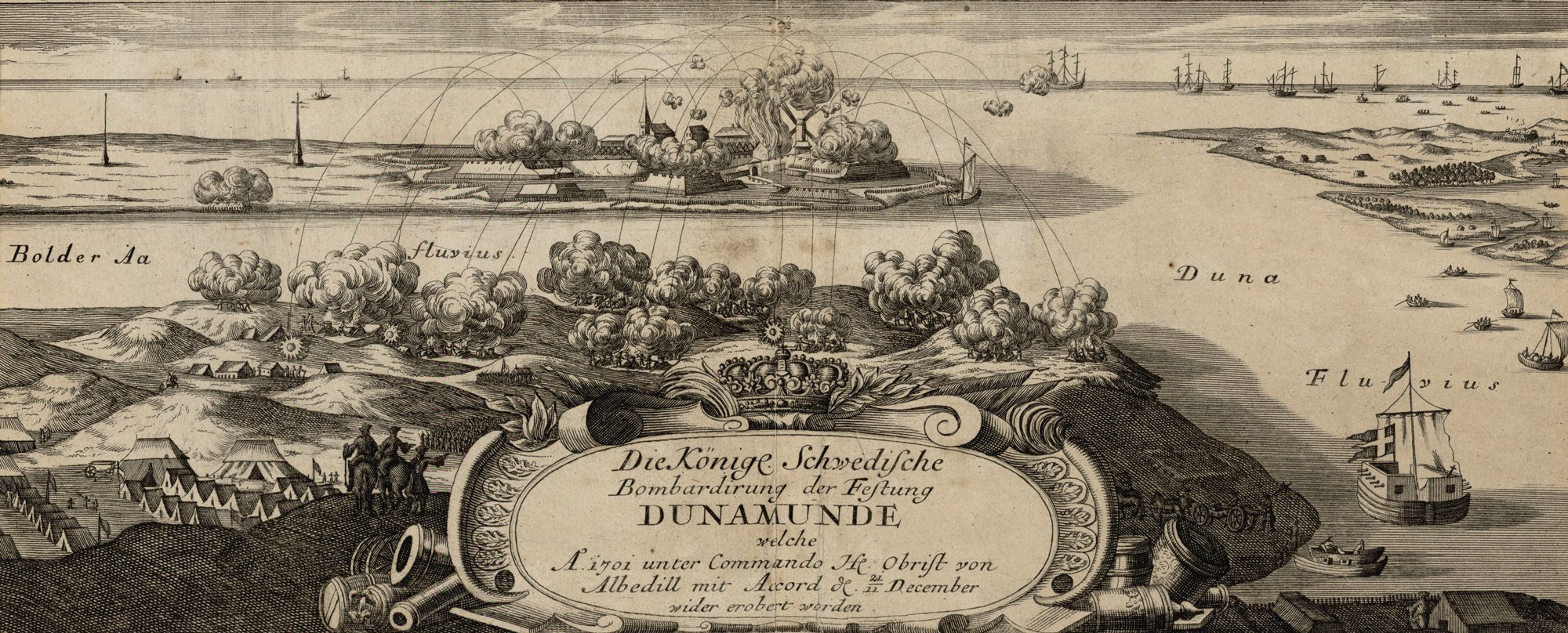
The Swedish army bombarding the fortress of Dünamünde in 1701.

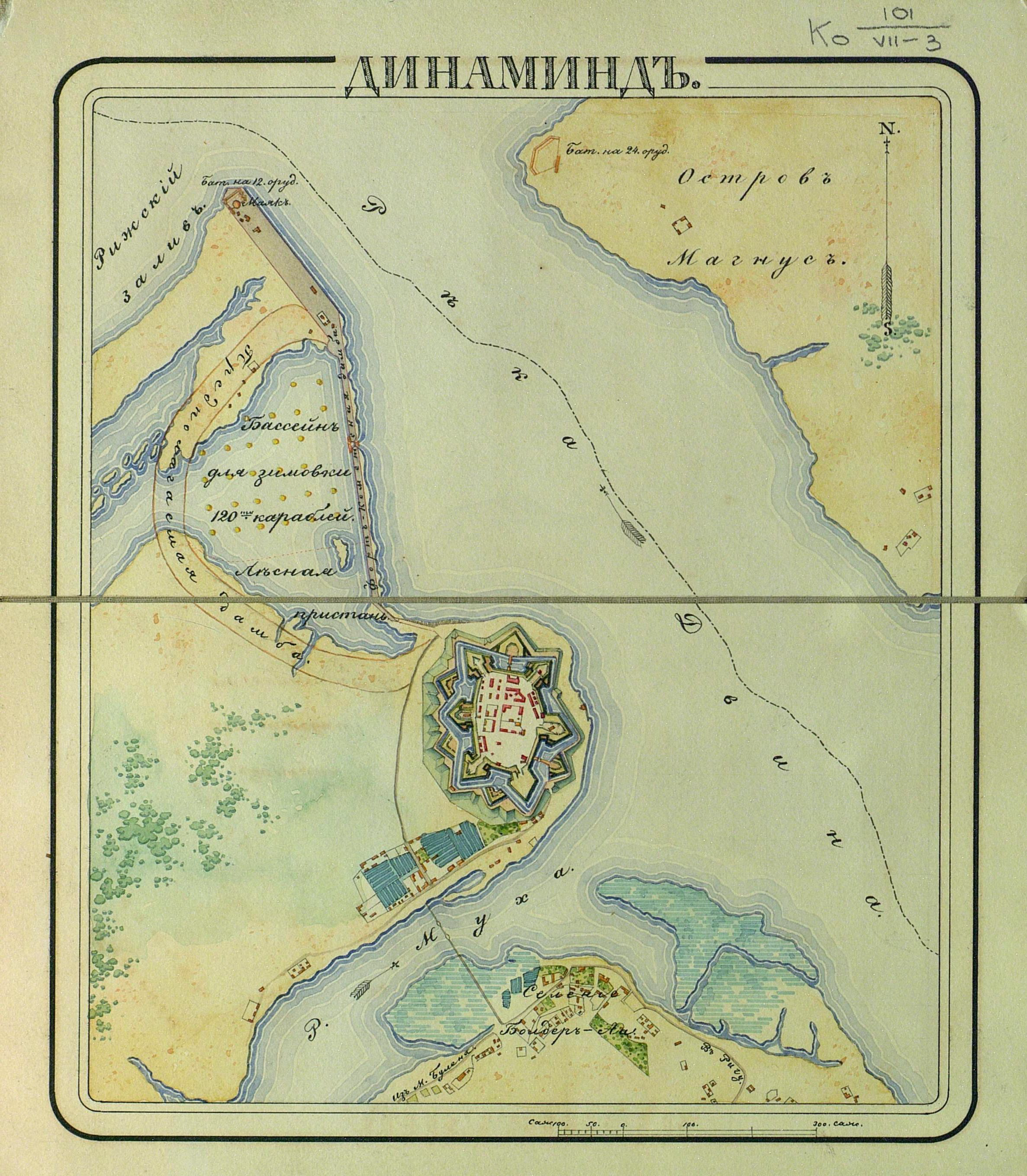
Fortress in 1830.

Swedish fortress of Neumünde on the right bank, designed in a Dutch style by General Rothenburg in 1641, replaced the ruined Dünaburg Castle by 1680.

In the second half of 16th century Daugava made a new river-bed and the new mouth about five kilometers to the west. Thence the Poles made the small fortress near the new river mouth. In 1582 the new fortress was inspected by King Stephen Bathory, who referred to it as Dynemunt. On August 1, 1608 the fortress was taken by the Swedes under Count Frederick Joachim von Mansfeld who renamed it Neumünde ("new mouth"). This new fortress is located in the area of contemporary Daugavgrīva neighborhood of Riga.

By 1653 a map issued by Swedish Military council showed that the Dünamünde fortress was destroyed and the Daugavgrīva castle was in ruins. Stones from the walls of castle were used for the construction of the new Daugavgrīva fortress on the other bank of Daugava river.

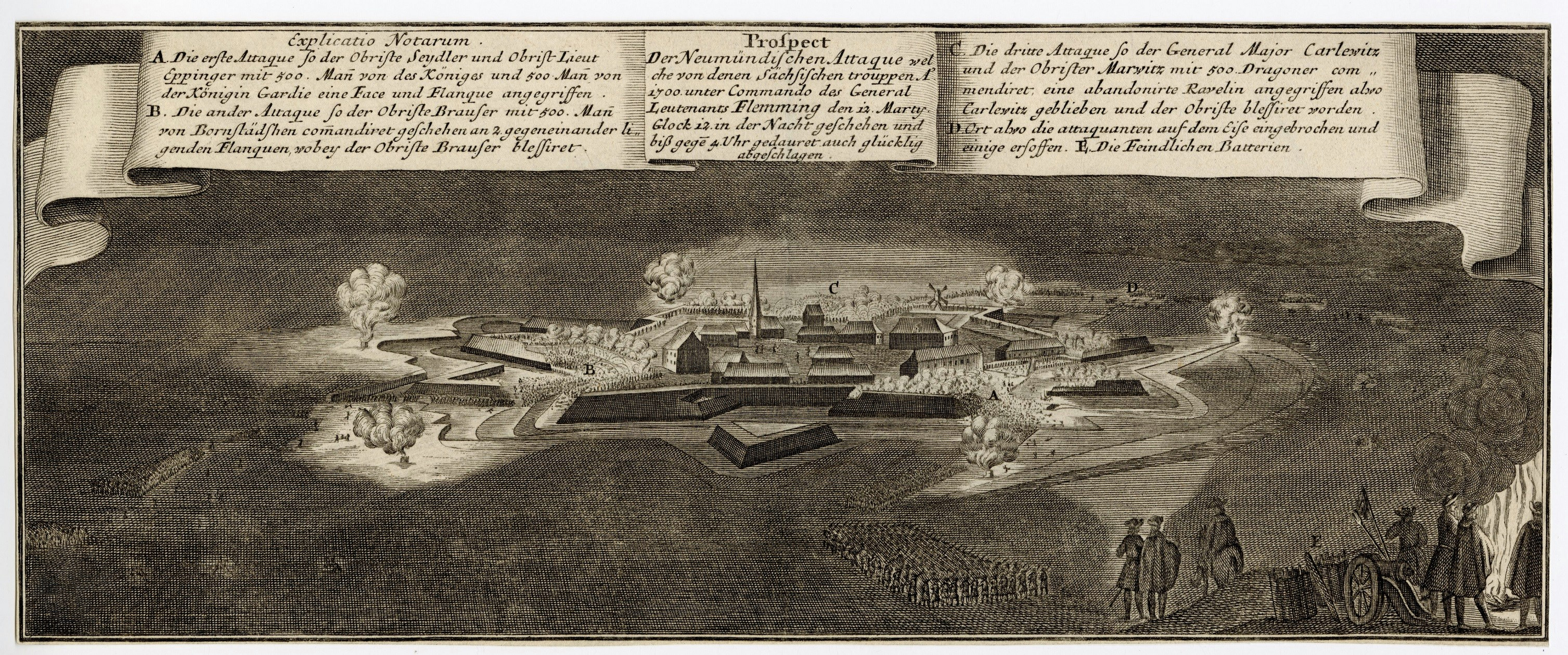
Saxon attack on the fortress of Neumünde (Daugavgrīva) on 22-23 March 1700. The attack took place at night. Alongside combat operations, it also depicts an everyday moment - three Saxon soldiers warming themselves by a campfire. A cannon is seen mounted on a baton nearby.

In 1700, Dünamünde was taken by the Saxons, but was retaken on December 11, 1701 by the Swedes again. Augustus II the Strong's campaign in Swedish Livonia had not produced satisfactory results. Though Dünamünde was captured and renamed "Augustusburg", he failed to take Riga or gain the support of the local nobility. Furthermore, Russia's forces had not yet entered the Great Northern War.

Joachim Cronman later became commandant and died there on March 5, 1703.

On August 10, 1710 fortress was taken by the Russians, when Commander Carl Adam von Stackelberg surrendered to general field marshal Boris Sheremetev after being assured of free escort for his troops. In accordance with terms of the treaty of Nystad (1721) Daugavgrīva fortress remained under Russian rule until Latvia's independence in 1918.

Since 1850-1852 this location also used as Riga's winter port. The Russian government in 1893 changed the name of the Dynemunt (in which only Russian soldiers lived) on Russian : Усть-Двинск . The fortifications of the fort were completely rebuilt before the outbreak of the First World War. During World War I, the fort was bombed by German air forces. Soon the Germans took over the fortress, and in 1917, the German Emperor Wilhelm II personally inspected it.

In 1940, the Soviet navy took over the fortress.

== Current activity ==
The fortress is open for tours on Saturdays and Sundays. Since the beginning of 2014, a local non-governmental organization Bolderaja Group has been actively involved in the revival and management of the fortress. Since 2016, the art and culture festival called Kometa is happening within the fortress.

== See also ==
- Daugavgrīva
- Capture of Daugavgrīva (1608)
- Battle of Daugavgriva (1609)

== Sources ==
- Fortifications commanding the mouth of the Daugava river
- Lövis of Menar. Die alte und neue Dünamünde (1908)
- В.Е.Жамов, Крепость Усть-Двинск (1912)
