= Von Uexküll =

Von Uexküll is a surname. Notable people with the surname include:

- Alexander Rudolf Karl von Uexküll (1829–1891), Baltic German politician
- Alexander Uexküll-Gyllenband (1864–1923), Russian-German philosopher
- Berend Johann von Uexküll (1630–1701), Baltic German politician
- Berend von Uexküll (1762–1827), Estonian knight and politician
- Berend Johann Friedrich von Uexküll (1793–1870), known as "Boris Uxkull", Baltic soldier, traveller and diarist
- Carl Wolmar Jakob von Uexküll (born 1944) Swedish-German writer, lecturer, philanthropist, activist and politician
- Georg Detloff von Uexküll-Gyllenband (1668–1710), Baltic German landowner and politician
- Gösta von Uexküll (1909–1993), German screenwriter and journalist
- Helmut von Uexküll (1925–2005), Estonian agricultural scientist
- Johann von Uexküll (died 1583), Baltic German noble and politician
- Johann von Uexküll (landlord)
- Jakob Johann von Uexküll (1864–1944), Baltic German biologist, zoologist and philosopher
- Konrad von Uexküll (1569–1638), Estonian Army officer and landowner
- Otto von Uexküll (field marshal) (died 1601), Swedish field marshal
- Otto von Uexküll (landlord) (died 1545), Estonian landlord
- Reinhold von Uexküll, Estonian landowner
