= Gertrud Schwend-Uexküll =

Gertrud Schwend-Üxküll
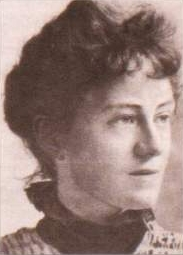
- Born: Gertrud von Uexküll-Gyllenband; 17 May 1867; Fortress Dünamünde, Riga, Governorate of Livonia, Imperial Russia
- Died: 15 January 1901; Stuttgart, Württemberg, Germany
- Education: Geneva; Paris
- Occupations: Teacher; Education pioneer
- Known for: founding Germany's first "Mädchenschule" (a "Gymnasium" secondary school - preparing girls for university admission)
- Spouse: Friedrich Schwend (1871-1934)
- Children: none
- Parents: Georg Reinhold, Baron von Uexküll (1825-1890) (father); Marie von Boehtlingk (1830-1881) (mother)

Gertrud Schwend-Uexküll (born "Gertrud, Baronesse von Uexküll-Gyllenband": 17 May 1867 – 15 January 1901) was a pioneer of girls' education. In 1899 she founded the "Mädchengymnasium" (secondary school for girls) in Stuttgart. It was the first such institution in the Kingdom of Württemberg and only the second anywhere in Germany.

== Life ==
=== Early years ===
Gertrud Baronesse Uexküll-Gyllenband was born into a well-established family at Fortress Dünamünde, a manor house on the grounds formerly occupied by a stronghold built by the Teutonic Knights, just outside Riga, a multicultural city which at that time found itself positioned on the outer fringes of the Russian Empire. She was born, the fifth of her parents' recorded children, into the German-speaking community which for historical reasons constituted the traditional land-owning ruling class in the region. Her father, Georg Reinhold Baron von Uexküll (1825-1890), was an army officer with specialities as an engineer. Gertrud attended a "Töchterschule" (girls' school) in Riga and then completed her schooling at a nearby boys' school where, unusually, she sat and passed the exams necessary to qualify her for work as a secondary school teacher. By that time her mother, born Marie von Boehtlingk (1830-1881), had died. Gertrud had been just 14 at the time, and was able to continue with her education. That was no longer the case in 1890 when her father also died. By this time, however, she was 23. Riga was experiencing rapid shifts in its ethnic population mix, driven by rapid urbanisation and the appearance of migrants from the Russian heartlands, generating potentially disruptive and dangerous inter-ethnic tensions: Gertrud set out on her travels while her elder brothers and sisters appear to have remained in what is now known as Latvia.

=== Geneva ===
She ended up in Geneva, then as now a relatively progressive city, and embarked on a course of study in art. She was unable to complete the course, however, due to the poor state of her eye-sight. She then switched to a Swiss girls' high school from where she successfully sat the exams necessary to gain admission to the university. At the University of Geneva she completed degree courses in History, Philosophy and Literature. Across central Europe, and indeed in Russia, Switzerland was regarded, as very advanced when it came to the education of women, but the idea that women might progress to university degrees was still contentious. Nevertheless, Gertrud Uexküll-Gyllenband was able to attend lectures, and she emerged with a form of degree described in sources as a "Licenciée ès Lettres".

She also involved herself in women's rights issues. As student-president of the Geneva Student Sorority, she successfully campaigned for the right of female students to be represented on the university council, and then became the first female student to participate in that committee's deliberations. It was also during her time as a student at Geneva that Gertrud Uexküll-Gyllenband met Friedrich Schwend (1871-1934), the man who a few years later became her husband. Directly after completing her student career in Geneva, however, she transferred to Paris university (La Sorbonne) in order to undertake a major academic project. Unfortunately the heart defect from which she suffered prevented her from staying very long in Paris, however. She transferred to a coastal location where she stayed long enough to recover and convalesce.

=== Tutoring in Germany ===
In the winter of 1898 she returned to Germany, now accompanied by the friend of her university days, Friedrich Schwend. They both settled in Stuttgart still, at this stage, unmarried: Gertrud's first job on settling in Stuttgart was as a private tutor, employed by wealthy families to teach their children French. (Under the customs of the time across western Europe, it would have been considered, at best, unconventional for a woman engaged in teaching other people's children to marry a man and give birth to children of her own at the same time.)

=== The school ===
It was not, however, Gertrud Schwend-Üxküll's intention to devote her life to private tutoring. She already had a clear vision to found a "Mädchengymnasium", a single-sex secondary school teaching a curriculum that would enable its pupils to attain a level of education appropriate for university admission. Admission to the school would be restricted to girls. Both in public and behind the scenes, she received active support from her cousin, the Countess Olga von Üxküll-Gyllenband, who was a lady in waiting to Queen Charlotte, and thereby very well connected with members of Württemberg's intellectual and wealthy elites. The school should open the way for girls to gain "admission to all faculties at the university, most especially for the study of Philology, Medicine and Law - subjects which could form the basis for a professional or academic career for women". Meanwhile, for girls with no intention of pursuing an academic career, the "Mädchengymnasium" must be an institution that unquestionably provided a "safe religious and ethical aesthetically grounded all-round education". The school opened in Stuttgart's royal "Residenz" quarter on 17 April 1899. It was not, as the school's twenty-first century website spells out, an "everyday secondary school", but a "teaching institution for the daughters of the educated classes". The foundation ceremony was conducted by Gertrud's cousin and the queen's lady in waiting, Countess Olga von Üxküll-Gyllenband (who also accepted a position as chair of the school governors) alongside Gertrud Schwend-Üxküll herself and Johanna Dorothea Bethe (who took on oversight of higher-level education). Gertrud took charge of the overall leadership and administrative responsibilities, and also conducted the classes in French herself, without accepting any payment for the teaching work. In order to save on costs, classes were initially held at the premises of a larger, established institution, the "Frauenfortbildungsanstalt" ("Women's Further Education Institute") at Kronenstraße 41. A year later, with the number of pupils enrolled at the school having risen to 32, the two institutions were physically separated, with Getrud's "Mädchengymnasium" relocating to premises on the second floor at Alleenstraße 29. It was only a year after that, as the school continued to expand, that over Easter in 1901 they were totally (and amicably) disaggregated in terms of organisation and administration.

Although Gertrud Schwend-Uexküll's Stuttgart "Mädchengymnasium" (secondary school for girls) was the first institution established to prepare girls for university admission in the Kingdom of Württemberg, there were other institutions opened with this objective elsewhere in German-speaking central Europe. Within Germany it was the neighbouring Grand Duchy of Baden which, on 28 February 1900, became was the first German state to issue a decree allowing women full access to universities. (Württemberg would follow suit only in 1904.) It was in the capital of Baden, Karlsruhe that the first school created to prepare girls for university admission had been established as far back as 1893, even if the Karlsruhe school's early years had not been entirely untroubled.

Meanwhile on 30 July 1899, some ten weeks after the Stuttgart school opened, Gertrud Schwend-Üxküll married Dr. Friedrich Schwend (1871-1934), who by this time had become the school's Geography teacher.

=== Women's movement ===
During her all too brief time in Stuttgart, Gertrud Schwend-Üxküll's hands-on commitment to improving opportunities for women extended far beyond her teaching work and the founding of a game-changing school. She opened the way for the launch of Stuttgart branch of Hedwig Dohm's "Women's Education and Study Association" ("Verein Frauenbildung–Frauenstudium") with an article she contributed to the 7 July 1900 edition of the magazine "Der Frauenberuf". She used this opportunity to set out the organisation's objectives and the nationwide character of its activities. She concluded her piece with some reflections on the desirability of establishing a Stuttgart branch:

"Both in Stuttgart and in other towns and cities in Württemberg, there are already a number of members [of the Berlin-based national association] who do not currently have any links to a local branch. And yet, particularly in Württemberg, where the founding of a "Mädchengymnasium" (girls' secondary school) has already taken place, marking an important step in the development of a schooling system that makes provision for girls ... it would be of particular value if a branch of this association were to be established, providing a forum through which all those who care passionately about girls' education - including, especially, those who are not actively engaged in the teaching profession - could share their experiences and opinions".

The article was followed by an editorial note, in which it was spelled out that in order to establish a Stuttgart branch of the "Women's Education and Study Association" it would be necessary to find at least 25 members. The note also informed readers, helpfully, that Mrs. Schwend-Üxküll would be available to provide further information for an hour each day between 14.00 and 15.00 at Alleenstraße 29.

On 14 November 1900 the time came for the founding meeting of the Stuttgart branch of the "Women's Education and Study Association" ("Verein Frauenbildung–Frauenstudium"). Initially there were between 80 and 100 members. Gertrud Schwend-Üxküll was at once elected to chair the Stuttgart association which, as she had foreseen, provided valuable support for the "Mädchengymnasium". For instance backed the first girls who had successfully completed the school final exams in their successful application for admission to the hitherto "men only" University of Tübingen. In the announcement of the establishment of the association journal, "Der Frauenberuf", which appeared on 17 November 1900, Gertrud Schwend-Üxküll summarized the association's objectives:

"The task [of the Stuttgart branch] should be to unite educated men and women in order to give good advice on how the educational opportunities available to women can be aligned with the many disparate requirements that modern life places on them."

=== Death ===
Two months after that inaugural meeting, on 15 January 1901, Gertrud Schwend-Üxküll died. Her death was the result of complications associated with her long-standing coronary illness. Those who mourned her early death also found much to celebrate in the achievements of her short life.
