= Capture of Daugavgrīva =

Part of the Polish–Swedish War in 1608

- Part of the Polish–Swedish War (1600–1611)
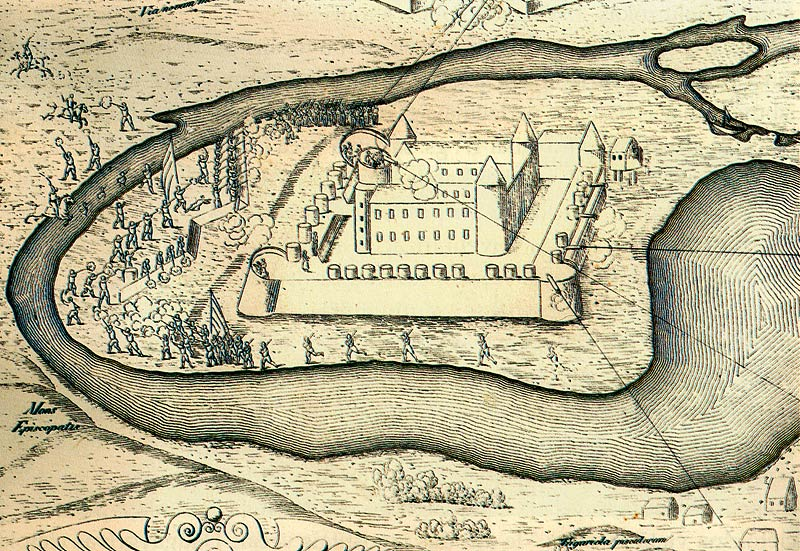
- Fortifications in Daugavgrīva in 1601
Date	27 July – 5 August 1608
Location	Daugavgrīva, Livonia (now in Latvia) 57°03′17″N 24°05′34″E
Result	Swedish victory
Territorial changes	Swedes capture Daugavgrīva

Belligerents
Polish–Lithuanian Commonwealth	(History of Sweden (1523–1611)) Sweden

Commanders and leaders
(Polish–Lithuanian Commonwealth) Franciszek Białłozor (surrendered)	(History of Sweden (1523–1611)) Frederick von Mansfeld

Strength
130 infantry 40 guns	8,000 infantry

Casualties and losses
Entire garrison surrendered	None

The Capture of Daugavgriva by Swedish forces in July 1608 occurred during the Polish–Swedish War (1600–1611).

Daugavgrīva castle (Polish: Dynemund, Swedish: Dünamünde) was the first objective of the Swedish forces during the campaign of 1608, due to its location near Riga (Daugavgrīva is Riga suburb today), and the fact that it could be used to block that city from the sea. When the Swedes, numbering 8000 troops and led by Joachim Frederick von Mansfeld, approached the fortress at Daugavgrīva, the Polish commander of the 130 strong garrison (with 40 cannons), Franciszek Białłozor, lacking in supplies and little hope of relief, decided to surrender. Swedes captured Daugavgriva on 5 August 1608.

The Poles recaptured the fortress a year later at the Battle of Daugavgriva (1609).

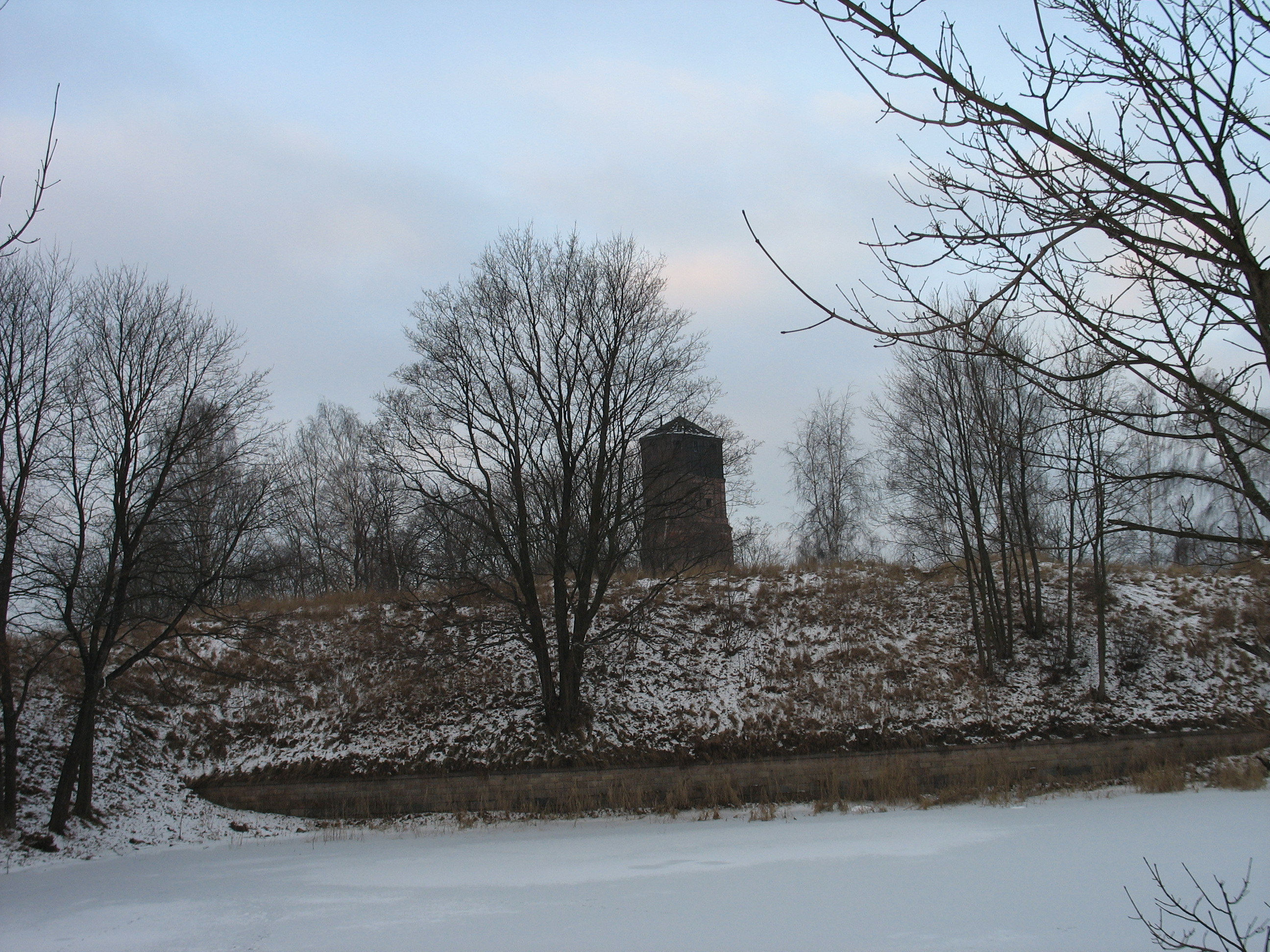
Tower of Daugavgriva on a hill behind the moat, architectural relic of the Fort of Daugavgrīva today (2006 photo)
