= Hugo von Hildesheim =

Hanseatic League merchant

Hugo von Hildesheim (fl. late 12th and early 13th centuries) was one of the few large and long-distance merchants from the early days of the Hanseatic League, whose individual fate can be reconstructed. He was active in the late 12th and early 13th centuries. In retrospect, he is described as very influential.

== Life ==
He probably originated from one of the two leading ministerial families of the episcopal city of Hildesheim at that time - either de Insula (in German: "von der Werder") or de veteri foro (in German: "vom alten Markt"). Both repeatedly presented both the city bailiff and the bailiff of St. Michael's Monastery. Hugo probably married Thanbrigge, a daughter of the Holstein Overboden Marcrad II, who in 1181 had been driven to Schleswig by Count Adolf III of Holstein. Hugo established his trading business between his hometown, Neumünster, Lübeck and Livonia. Through his wedding, he is a well known example of the connection between the early Hansa-early urban elite and the old free and low noble rural families.

Around the same time, a Hugo von Hildesheim is known, who was abbot of the Augustinian canons at Neumünster. In addition, in 1224 Thanbrigge donated 2½ hufe of land in Holstein's Brachfeld from the possession of the monastery to the Daugavgrīva Abbey in today's Riga. Both suggest that the abbot and the merchant Hugo were the same person.
