= Surviving the Century =

2007 book edited by Herbert Girardet

- Editor: Herbert Girardet
- Author: World Future Council
- Genre: Non-fiction
- Publisher: Earthscan
- Publication date: 2007

Surviving the Century: Facing Climate Chaos and Other Global Challenges, edited by Herbert Girardet, is the first major book from the World Future Council, published by Earthscan in 2007. Eight main issues relating to the politics of climate change are covered in the book: countering climate chaos, renewable energy policy, creating sustainable cities, local farming systems, rainforests and climate change, cradle to cradle production systems, an alternative vision for trade and creating a living democracy.

== See also ==
- Ten Technologies to Fix Energy and Climate
- Greenhouse Solutions with Sustainable Energy
