= Daugavgrīva Abbey =

Church building in Latvia

Coordinates: 57°03′17″N 24°05′34″E

Daugavgrīva Abbey or Dünamünde Abbey (Latvian: Daugavgrīvas klosteris; German: Kloster Dünamünde; Latin: Mons S. Nicolai) was a Cistercian monastery in Daugavgrīva (German: Dünamünde) in Latvia, about 12 kilometres from Riga, of which Daugavgrīva has formed a district since 1959. The site was re-developed from 1305 as Daugavgrīva Castle.

== History ==
The abbey was founded in 1205 by Albert of Buxhoeveden, bishop of Riga, on the right bank of the Daugava river, and settled by monks from Pforta Abbey, of the filiation of Morimond. The first abbot, Theoderich of Treyden, also known as Theoderich of Estland, had already been active in the mission to Livonia. The second abbot, in the 1210s, was Bernard II of Lippe.

The abbey's estates were in part extremely distant. For example, it owned 30 oxgangs (Hufen) of land at Rägelin in Temnitzquell in Brandenburg that had been given to it by the Edler von Plote, on which it ran a farm. During a revolt of the Curonians and Semigallians in 1228 the monks were killed and the monastery destroyed, although soon rebuilt. In 1263 the wooden church was destroyed by a fire. In 1305 the abbey was sold to the Livonian Order, which established its commandery there and converted the site to a fortress, Daugavgrīva Castle or Dünamünde Castle. The monks moved to Padise Abbey in Estonia.

== Site and buildings ==
The church abutted on its east side onto a strong square tower. Along the east wall of the abbey precinct were two buildings for the use of the monks, while the lay brothers had a building on the west wall. To the north were two towers. The entrance was located in the south-west corner of the outer defensive perimeter, which was surrounded by a moat more than 40 metres wide.

== Bibliography ==
- Dimier, M.-Anselme (1971): L'art cistercien hors de France, p 55. Zodiaque: La Pierre-qui-Vire
- Schneider, Ambrosius (1986): Lexikale Übersicht der Männerklöster der Cistercienser im deutschen Sprach- und Kulturraum, in: Schneider, Ambrosius; Wienand, Adam; Bickel, Wolfgang; Coester, Ernst (eds.): Die Cistercienser, Geschichte – Geist – Kunst, 3rd edn., pp 650f. Wienand Verlag Köln ISBN 3-87909-132-3
