= Herbert Girardet =

German-British writer and filmmaker (born 1943)

Herbert Girardet (born 25 May 1943) is a German-British writer, filmmaker, lecturer and international consultant.

== Life and work ==
Herbert Girardet was born in 1943 in Essen, Germany, the son of a publishing executive. After reading history at Tübingen and Berlin universities, he moved to London in 1964 and embraced the nascent counterculture then taking hold there: the literary editor Diana Athill, who knew him during this time, described him in her memoir Make Believe as "the drop-out son of a rich German family... deep in the process of discovering his own loathing of capitalism, violence, and racism."

In 1971, as a community worker in Notting Hill Gate, Girardet befriended the US Black Power activist Hakim Jamal, a published author. They decided to join forces to set up a commune and a publishing enterprise 'The First Caribbean Publishing Company' for producing educational materials on black history and emancipation in Georgetown, Guyana. But this project quickly foundered amid the chaos caused by Jamal's mental instability. Arriving back in London soon afterwards, Girardet returned to academia and received a bachelor’s degree in anthropology and economics from the London School of Economics in 1975.

Since then, Girardet has worked as a cultural and urban ecologist – as a writer, filmmaker, lecturer and international consultant – specialising in 'regenerative development'. He is the author and co-author of 14 books and reports, and 50 TV documentaries primarily concerned with the interaction between a global civilisation and the world’s environment. He is a recipient of a UN Global 500 award for outstanding environmental services. He has written in publications such as Resurgence & Ecologist, The Ecologist, Green Futures, Urban Futures, Habitat Debate, The Guardian, The Independent and The Observer.

He is co-founder and honorary member of the World Future Council, and a full member of the Club of Rome. He has been a consultant to UN Habitat and UNEP, and to cities such as London, Vienna, Riyadh and Bristol. As inaugural 'thinker in residence', he developed a green development strategy for Adelaide which has been fully implemented. He is an honorary fellow of the Royal Institute of British Architects, and a visiting professor at the University of the West of England.

In the 2020s, Herbert Girardet was instrumental in setting up the 'True Cost Alliance', an institution with the aim of transforming accounting practices and the economic system to accurately reflect what are currently considered 'externalities', or the hidden costs of environmental damage. Coordinated by the World Future Council, it was launched in September 2024.

He is married with two grown-up sons and lives with his wife Barbara in Tintern, Monmouthshire.

== Books ==
- Creating Regenerative Cities: How we can develop a regenerative relationship between our cities and planet earth; Routledge, 2015. ISBN 9781317654100
- A Renewable World: Alternative energy systems and how they can help us create a viable and equitable future; Green Books, 2009. ISBN 9781900322492
- Cities, People, Planet: Learning from urban history to enhance the relationship between urban people and our home planet; Wiley, 2004 and 2008. ISBN 9780470772706
- Surviving The Century: 12 authors write about how we might evade the collision course between ourselves and our own future; Routledge, 2008. ISBN 9781844076123
- Creating The World Future Council: The booklet which launched a new international NGO – the World Future Council; Green Books, 2005. OCLC 1255737834
- Creating A Sustainable Adelaide: Report on practical policies for creating a green new deal for Adelaide and South Australia, 2003. ISBN 9781876702892
- The Peoples' Planet: Based on a six-part television series produced by NHK, Tokyo, and CNN; published only in Japanese by NHK, 2000.
- Creating Sustainable Cities: Cities are wasteful superorganisms that need a better understanding of how to develop a circular metabolism; Green Books, 1999. ISBN 9781870098779
- Making Cities Work: Organisational challenges and practicalities of creating a sustainable world of cities; Earthscan 1996. ISBN 1-85383-354-1
- The Gaia Atlas Of Cities: New directions for sustainable urban living, in theory and practice; Gaia Books, 1992 and 1996. ISBN 9781856750974
- Earthrise: How we are affecting the biosphere, and how we can try to get out of the mess we have been making; Paladin, 1992. ISBN 9780586092521
- Blueprint For A Green Planet: Practical day-today action to fight pollution and to live sustainably; Dorling Kindersley, 1987. ISBN 9780863183645
- Far From Paradise: A history of human impacts on the environment, based on a seven-part television series: BBC Publications, 1986. ISBN 9780563203575
- Land For The People: At a time of economic uncertainty, we need a new balance between urban and rural living; Crescent Books, 1976. ISBN 978-0950542003

Nine of these books have been published in various foreign-language editions.

== Television documentaries ==
Herbert Girardet has produced 50 television documentaries on sustainable development, including:

- The Peoples’ Planet: Six-part series filmed in 20 countries, on addressing human impacts on the biosphere, and alternatives to pollution and destruction; CNN, NHK, Tokyo, Discovery Channel and Canal Plus, Paris, 2000.
- Deadline 2000: 28 three-minute films featuring leading voices in the sustainability movement; Channel 4, London, 1999.
- Metropolis: 50-minute documentary about London’s metabolism, examining London’s resource use, economy and waste disposal; Channel 4, London, 1998.
- Ancient Knowledge, Modern World: 20-minute interview-based documentary with Dr. Oku Ampofo, founder of Ghana’s Centre for Research into Plant Medicine, 1997.
- Urban Best Practices: 40-minute film about urban regeneration projects in various countries, made for the UN City Summit in Istanbul, 1996.
- Letter To The Kayapo: Anita Roddick confirming the commitment of the Bodyshop to help protect the Amazon and its people, 1990.
- Halting The Fires: 50-minute documentary about the fires set in the Amazon to establish cattle ranches and mines; and about alternatives to deforestation; filmed in Brazil for Channel 4, and ARD, Hamburg, 1989.
- The Altamira Gathering: 15-minute news documentary about the first ever gathering of Amazonian tribes to try and protect their rainforest home; filmed in Brazil for Channel 4, London, 1989.
- Jungle Pharmacy: 50-minute documentary on the plant remedies used by Amazonian Indians, and their relevance for modern medicine; filmed in Brazil, Peru, the UK and US; Channel 4. Winner of five awards at environmental film festivals, 1988.
- Towards A Green Planet: Series of six 20-minute films on personal action to reduce human impacts on the environment; Channel 4, London, 1987.
- Far From Paradise, the story of human impact on the environment: Pioneering seven-hour series filmed in 12 countries, initiated/ researched by Herbert Girardet and presented by John Seymour; BBC 2, ZDF, Germany, ORF, Austria, and RAI, Italy, 1986.

== See also ==
- Jakob von Uexkull
- Amory Lovins
- E. F. Schumacher
- Renewable energy policy
- Sustainability
- Club of Rome
