= World Future Council =

German non-profit foundation

- Formation: 2004; 22 years ago, Foundation since 2005; 21 years ago
- Founder: Barbara Seiller
- Legal status: Foundation
- Headquarters: Hamburg, Germany
- Services: International understanding, climate justice/action, sustainable development, environmental protection, just and equitable energy transition, agroecology and sustainable food systems, ethical voice for the needs and rights of future generations and nature, policy research.
- Leader: Neshan Gunasekera, Chief Executive Officer; Franz-Theo Gottwald, Chairman of the Supervisory Board
- Key people: Jakob von Uexküll
- Staff: 12
- Website: www.worldfuturecouncil.org

The World Future Council (WFC) is a German non-profit foundation with its headquarters in Hamburg. It works to safeguard the rights of future generations and nature by promoting future just policies and decision making. The WFC is known for its World Future Policy Award, which highlights exemplary policies from across the world in various areas. The 2025 World Future Policy Award ceremony was help at the International Union for Conservation of Nature (IUCN) conference in Abu Dhabi in October 2025. The conference topic was Living in Harmony with Nature and Future Generations.

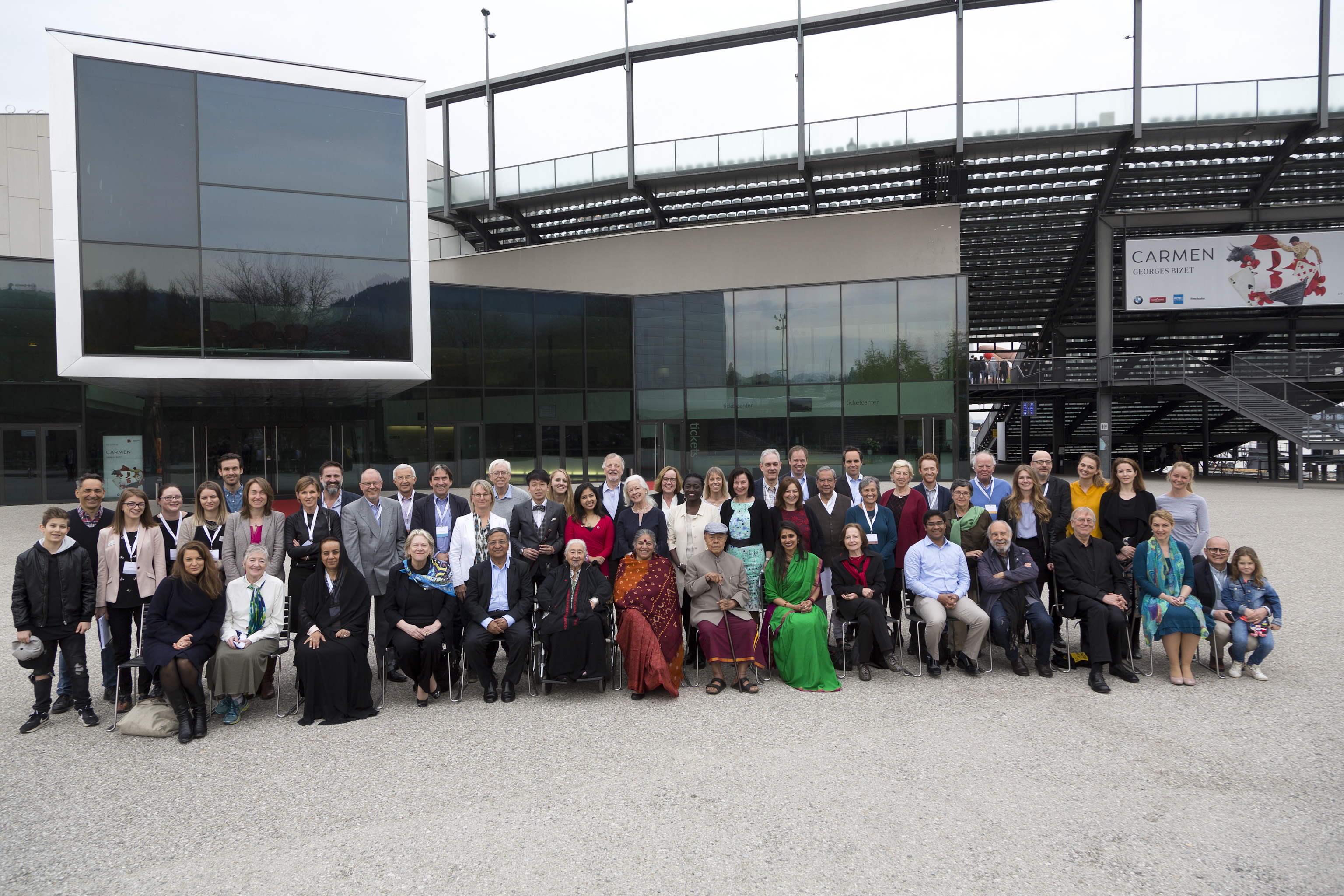
Annual General Meeting 2017

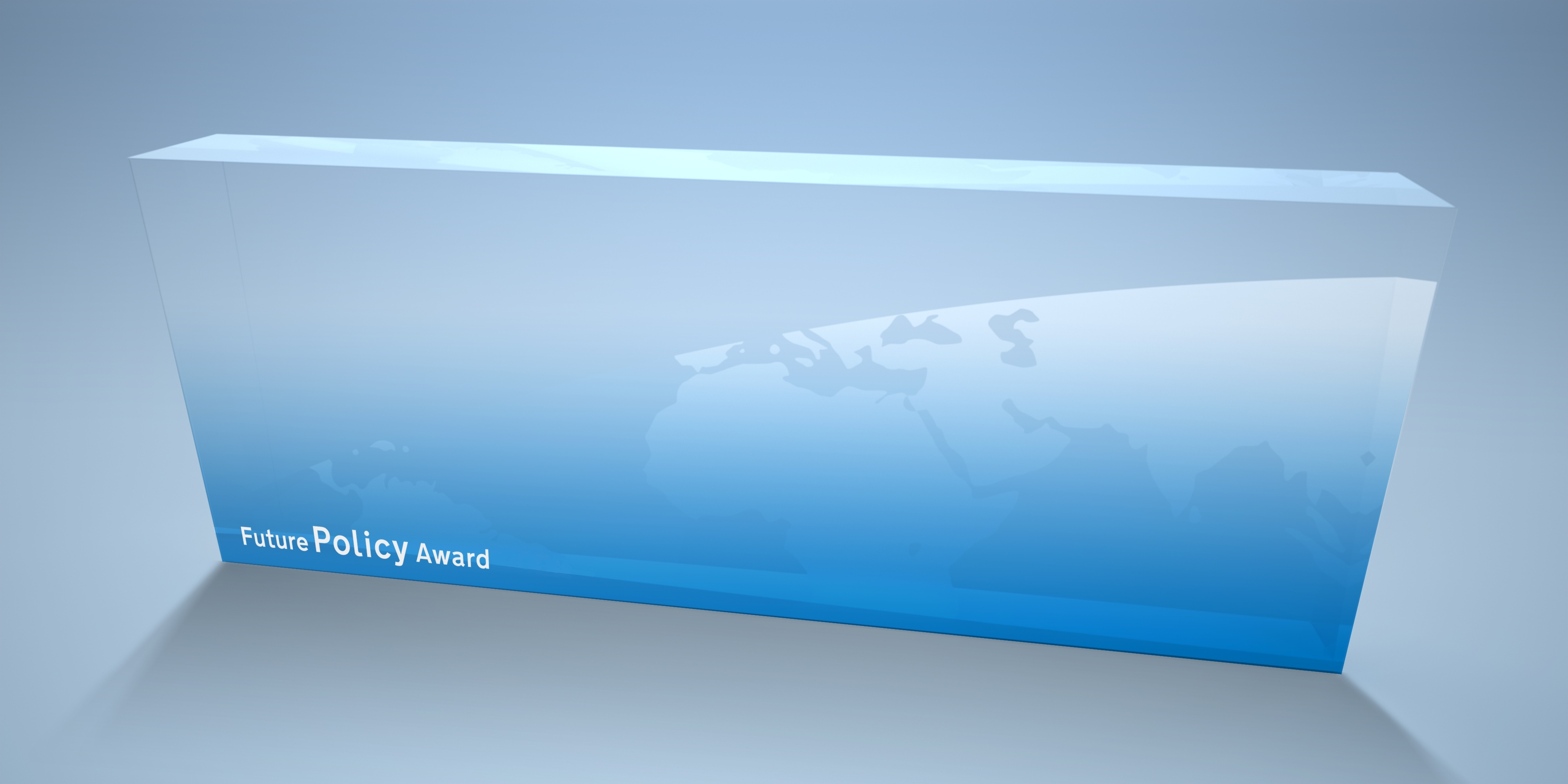
Future Policy Award

== History ==
The organization was initiated in 2000 by Jakob von Uexküll the support of Herbert Girardet, Michael Otto and Barbara Seiller, and described by Uexküll and Girardet in the book "Creating the World Future Council" in 2004.

The organization was officially launched in London in October 2004, with funding from private donors in Germany, Switzerland, the United States, and the United Kingdom. In 2005, the WFC was recognized as a legitimate foundation under civil law. Since 2006, its headquarters have been located in Hamburg, where it is registered as a charitable foundation. It has branch offices in London, Brussels, Delhi, and Washington.

The current statute, which sets the framework for a global charitable foundation with members from all over the world, has been in force since 2007.

The Council, which also functions as a think tank, met for the first time in Hamburg in May 2007. It works closely with international networks—comprising approximately 25,000 parliamentarians and 8,000 civil society organizations—to identify and disseminate long-term solutions to the global issues of the day. The basic financing from 2007 to 2009 was provided by the Free and Hanseatic City of Hamburg as well as by donations from the entrepreneur Michael Otto and the brothers Rickmers.

== FuturePolicy.org ==
The World Future Council maintains a website 'futurepolicy.org' which presents political solutions and assists decision-makers in developing and implementing future just policies. It is an online database designed for policy-makers to simplify the sharing of existing and proven policy solutions to tackle the world's most fundamental and urgent problems. It now contains policies, for example on renewable energies, energy efficiency, sustainable cities and food production in the era of climate change, that have been promoted in WFC publications, films and hearings.

== Future Policy Award ==
The World Future Council operates the Future Policy Award (FPA), also known as the "Polit-Oscar", which is the only prize in the world to award laws that promote better living conditions for present and future generations. The award honors future-oriented policy on an international level, according to the organization. Between 2009 and 2021, 60 policy instruments from 40 countries were awarded in the areas of nature and environmental protection, human rights and peace.

== Research and publications ==
- Miguel Mendonça, David Jacobs and Benjamin K. Sovacool (2009). Powering the Green Economy: The Feed-In Tariff Handbook, Earthscan, ISBN 978-1-84407-858-5
- Herbert Girardet and Miguel Mendonça (2009). A Renewable World: Energy, Ecology, Equality, Green Books, ISBN 978-1-900322-49-2
- Herbert Girardet (editor) (2008). Surviving the Century: Facing Climate Chaos and Other Global Challenges, Earthscan, ISBN 978-1-84407-612-3
- Herbert Girardet (2008). Cities People Planet: Liveable Cities for a Sustainable World, Wiley, ISBN 0-470-85284-4
- Miguel Mendonça (2007). Feed-in Tariffs: Accelerating the deployment of renewable energy, Earthscan, ISBN 978-1-84407-788-5
- Jakob von Uexkull and Herbert Girardet (2005). Shaping our Future: Creating the World Future Council, Green Books / World Future Council Initiative, ISBN 1-903998-46-8

== See also ==
- Futures studies
