= Üksküla =

Üksküla is an Estonian surname a variant of Üxküll. Notable people with the surname include:

- Aarne Üksküla (1937 – 2017), Estonian film and stage actor and theatre instructor
- Kristjan Üksküla (born 1987), Estonian film and stage actor
- Siina Üksküla (born 1938), Estonian film and stage actress
