= Miguel Mendonça =

Anglo-Azorean writer (born 1973)

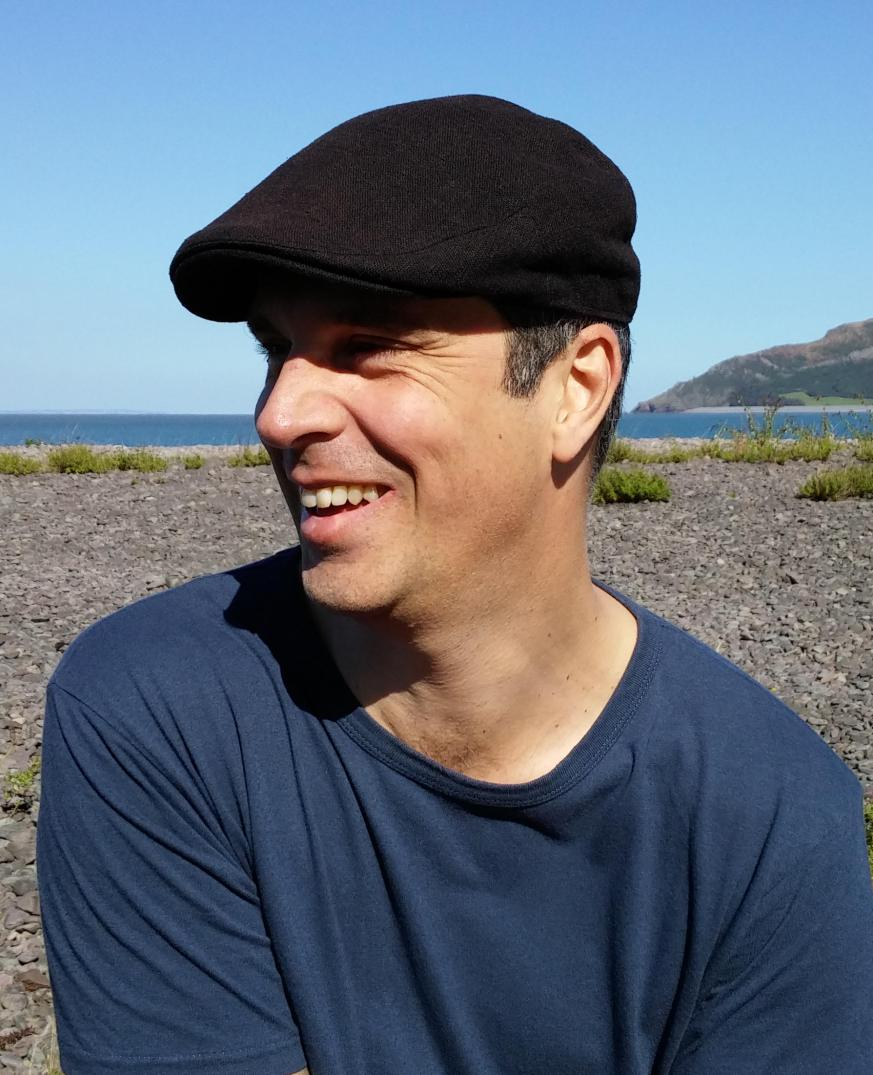
- Miguel Mendonça, 2015
- Born: August 1973 (age 53); Salisbury, Rhodesia
- Citizenship: GB
- Occupations: Writer, musician
- Writing career
- Subjects: Sustainability, UAP, extraterrestrial contact, wisdom, art and creativity, spirituality
- Notable works: Make/Manifest, Wisdom, Being with the Beings, We Are the Disclosure, Meet the Hybrids, Quick! Act Normal, Powering the Green Economy, Feed-in Tariffs, A Renewable World
- Website: www.miguelmendonca.com

Miguel Mendonça (born August 1973) is an Anglo-Azorean writer and musician based in Bristol, England.

== Early life and education ==
Mendonça was born in Harare, Zimbabwe, and grew up in England. He studied forestry at Sparsholt College, landscape management at Hadlow College, journalism and radio production at FAS, geography and history at University College Cork, and social science and environmental ethics at the Open University.

== Sustainability work ==
Mendonça's sustainability career is most associated with his work on feed-in tariffs, a renewable energy policy. He did advocacy and education work on this topic on four continents, contributing to legislative changes in several countries. Much of this work was carried out while he served as a Research Manager for the World Future Council, which is an international NGO. In addition, he subsequently worked with The Converging World, a renewable energy-focused charity based in Bristol, England.

For a short period of time, Mendonça also worked as a freelance sustainability researcher and writer in which he produced two key studies. The first reviewed the first year performance and outcomes of the UK feed-in tariff in 2011, and the second assessed The Green Economy in Bristol and the West of England, which was published in January 2012. The latter examined the size and make-up of the environmental technologies sector in the region at that time. His works also surveyed the UK green policy environment, and summarized some of the other key aspects of a green economy, including sustainable design of goods and services, retail, food, and well-being. The report concluded with a call for 'Resilience Planning', an ongoing process of strategic collaboration between actors and stakeholders in the region, with the main purpose of meeting local needs sustainably through investment in local assets. The integration and optimization of food, energy and transport systems were central focuses, and he argued that the development of resilience should merge the agendas of sustainability, economic development, social capital development, participatory democracy and emergency planning.

Miguel wrote and co-wrote several books, and numerous articles, book chapters and papers on sustainability and renewable energy policy. He is the author of Feed-in Tariffs: accelerating the deployment of renewable energy, published by Earthscan in 2007. He is also co-author of Powering the Green Economy: The Feed-In Tariff Handbook (Earthscan, 2009) and A Renewable World: Energy, Ecology, Equality (Green Books, 2009).

During this period Miguel held research fellowships at the University of Bristol and at Birkbeck College, University of London. He served on the advisory boards of the Alliance for Renewable Energy, Global Urban Development, Our Future Planet and Raw Foundation.

== Fiction writing ==
His first work of fiction, a collection of 11 short stories and a novella, was published as Quick! Act Normal in February 2013 under the pen name of Michael Ford. These stories explore human experience, and in particular our relationships with ourselves, each other and the world in which we live.

== Consciousness and contact writing ==
In late 2015, Miguel published Meet the Hybrids – The Lives and Missions of ET Ambassadors on Earth. This non-fiction book explores the subject of ET-human hybrids from the inside, by interviewing eight individuals who understand that they are part-extraterrestrial and part-human. The book is co-authored with Barbara Lamb, a licensed marriage and family therapist, and regression therapist, who has for the last 25 years worked with over 1,700 clients with regard to extraterrestrial encounters.

In the fall of 2016, Mendonça published a people's history of the extraterrestrial subject, titled We Are the Disclosure. Through interviews with 26 people who have been active in the field for a combined total of over 650 years, the books explore the scale and scope of the subject. It was inspired by the findings of Meet the Hybrids, and set out to reflect the more spiritual narrative emerging from that community. The book covers the spectrum of interest in the field, running from the masculine-technological-historical-political aspects, to the feminine-wellbeing-metaphysical-spiritual aspects. Mendonça interviewed a wide variety of subjects, including scientists, journalists and therapists, many of whom claim ET contact in different forms. The book also examined the state of the field, looking at its development since 1947, and traced its connections deep into the human past. The varying opinions of top-down versus bottom-up 'Disclosure' of the ET presence on Earth were discussed. And it opened up a deeper dialogue on what this field tells us about the nature of being and the journey of the soul.

In March 2017, Mendonça published the final part of his trilogy on ET-human interaction, titled Being with the Beings – The How and the Why of ET Contact. It is a study of contact experiences between humans and various kinds of beings, particularly extraterrestrials and interdimensionals. Nine long-term experiencers are interviewed, such as channelers, hybrids, artists and therapists. The key topics discussed are: how and why the contact takes place; how it has shaped their lives; and their ET-contact techniques and safety protocols. It is illustrated with diagrams, representations of the beings they are in contact with, and 'downloaded' images including 'light language' and geometric designs.

== Music ==
In his music production Mendonça's artist name is sokamiru, and he has released four albums: On Out Into, Into Galactic, Hot Wisdom and Portals. He produces on modular synthesizer and Akai MPC.

On Out Into is a collection of tracks created as explorations of a wide variety of modules and techniques, principally for his sokamiru YouTube channel. Into Galactic is a concept album about his life beyond Earth, back out among the stars. Hot Wisdom is inspired by his research on art, mystery and wisdom. Portals is a collection of ambient works. He continues to find inspiration in the finest qualities of human nature, and the awe-inspiring nature of existence.

== Glass work ==
Mendonça also worked in glass, producing lamps, light catchers and light shades in stained glass, and cast sculptural pieces.

== Albums ==
- Portals, 2022
- Hot Wisdom, 2022
- Into Galactic, 2022
- On Out Into, 2021

== Books ==
- Make/Manifest – A Life in Art and Craft, 2021 ISBN 9798592695360
- Wisdom: Now and Always, 2020 ISBN 979-8674347774
- Being with the Beings: The How and the Why of ET Contact, 2017 ISBN 9781544270852
- We Are the Disclosure: A People's History of the Extraterrestrial Field, 2016 ISBN 9781720756156
- Meet the Hybrids: The Lives and Missions of ET Ambassadors on Earth (with Barbara Lamb), 2015 ISBN 9781544814773
- Quick! Act Normal: 12 Short Stories (as Michael Ford), 2011 ISBN 9781544815084
- A Renewable World: Energy, Ecology, Equality (with Herbert Girardet), Green Books, 2009 ISBN 9781900322492
- Powering the Green Economy: The Feed-In Tariff Handbook (with David Jacobs and Benjamin Sovacool), Earthscan, 2009 ISBN 9781844078578
- Feed-in Tariffs: Accelerating the Deployment of Renewable Energy, Earthscan, 2007 ISBN 9781844074662

== Selected writings ==
- Orange Deals: Solar Energy Policy Initiatives Worldwide. 2012, SEEM [chapter author]
- The Green Economy in Bristol and the West of England. 2012, Bristol Green Capital
- The UK Feed-in Tariff: A User Survey. 2011, Birkbeck College, University of London
- 100%: 100% Renewable Energy in Practice. 2009, Earthscan [chapter co-author]
- Wind Energy International 2009/2010. 2009, World Wind Energy Association [chapter co-author]
- Stability, Participation and Transparency in Renewable Energy Policy: Lessons from Denmark and the United States. 2009, Policy and Society, Elsevier [lead author]
- Green Breakthroughs. 2008, UNEP [contributing writer]
- Renewable Energy Global Status Report 2008-2011. REN21 [topical researcher]
- Feed-In Tariffs – Boosting Energy for our Future. 2006, World Future Council
- Policies to Change the World. 2006, World Future Council
