= Daugavgrīva castle =

Castle in Latvia

Daugavgrīva Castle
- Daugavgrīvas pils
- Skanstnieku iela, Vecdaugava; Near Riga in Latvia
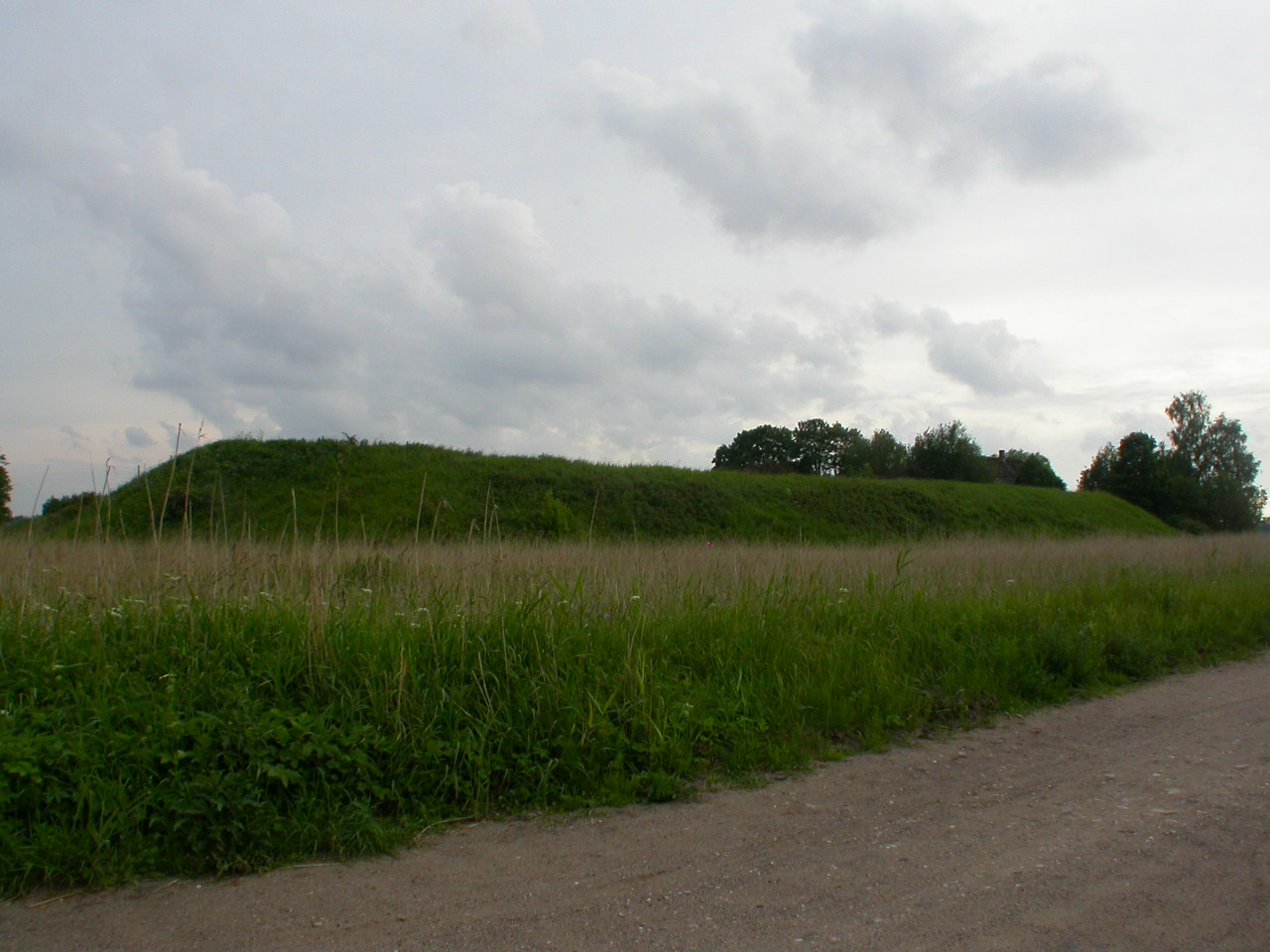
- Ruins of Daugavgrīva Medieval castle (2004)

Site information
- Type: Castle
- Open to the public: yes
- Condition: ruins

Location
- Coordinates: 57°3′17″N 24°5′34″E

Site history
- Built: 1305
- Built by: Livonian Branch of the Teutonic Knights
- Materials: dolomite
- Demolished: by 1653

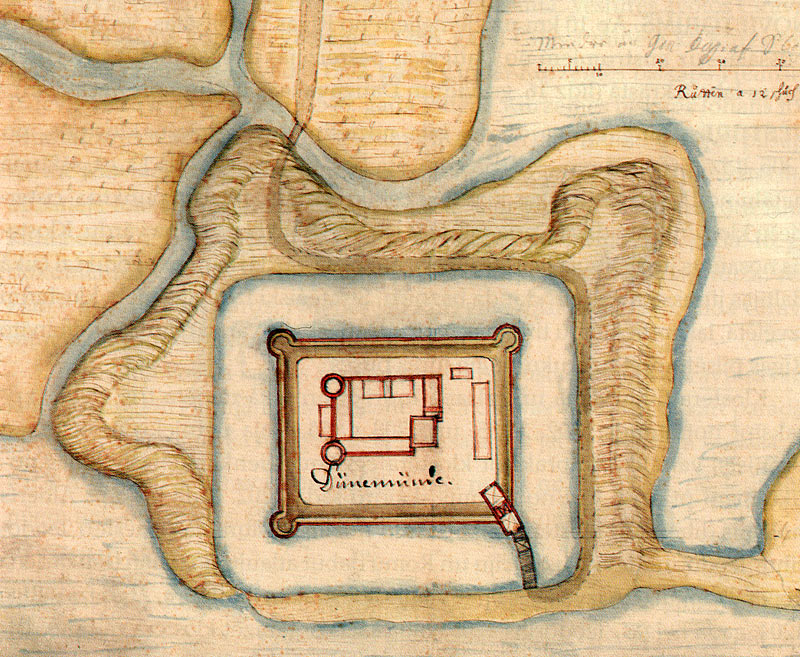
Daugavgriva Castle engraved by Giacomo Lauro in 1601.

Daugavgrīva Castle (German: Dünamünde; Polish: Dynemunt; Russian: Усть-Двинск or Ust`-Dvinsk) is a former monastery converted into a castle, located at Vecdaugava oxbow on the right bank of Daugava, in the northern part of Riga city, in the Vidzeme region of Latvia. Nowadays here are seen only earthen ramparts.

== History ==
The first settlement, Daugavgrīva Abbey, was established on the right bank of the Daugava river, 13 miles from Bishop Albert of Riga's residence in Riga, by Cistercian monks from Pforta in 1205. Theoderich von Treyden was an early abbot, while during the 1210s Count Bernhard II of Lippe was its abbot. During a raid of tribal Curonians in 1228, the monastery and its tombs were destroyed, although the monks rebuilt the abbey after fighting died down. They also had to endure abuse by the undisciplined crusaders of the Livonian Order. Those knights were defeated at the Battle of Saule, however, and their remnants were incorporated into the Teutonic Knights in 1237. Until 1452 the territory of Siggelkow in Mecklenburg was owned by the monastery. In 1305, the local abbot sold the monastery to the Livonian Branch of the Teutonic Knights, who began construction of the fortress of Dünamünde.

In 1329, the knights' castle was taken by the burghers of Riga, who were forced to return it to the knights in 1435. In 1481, the knights closed the Daugava to navigation by stretching an iron chain from Dünamünde to the opposite riverbank, thus hoping to ruin Riga's trade. In retaliation the citizens of Riga captured Dünamünde and destroyed it. The knights returned to rebuild the stronghold eight years later. Because Riga itself was controlled by the Archbishops, the local administrative seat (Komturei) of the monastic state of the Teutonic Knights was located in Dünamünde.

In 1561 during the Livonian War, Dünamünde became part of the Grand Duchy of Lithuania and afterwards of the Polish–Lithuanian Commonwealth.

The Skanstnieki homestead was built inside the ramparts in the 19th century.

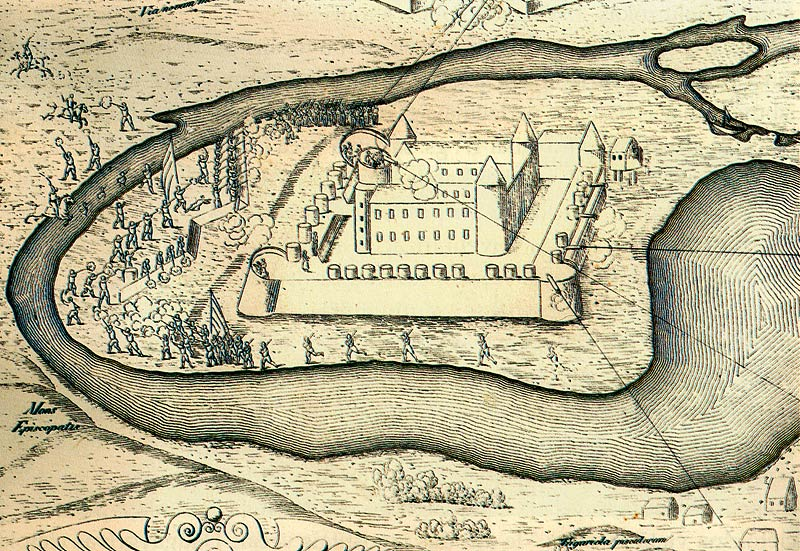
The Siege of Daugavgrīva Castle during the Polish-Swedish War in 1601. Engraving of Džakomo Lauro.

== See also ==
- List of castles in Latvia
- Daugavgrīva
- Capture of Daugavgrīva (1608)
- Battle of Daugavgriva (1609)

== Sources ==
- Zarāns, Alberts (2006). Latvijas pilis un muižas. Castles and manors of Latvia (in Latvian and English). Riga. ISBN 9984-785-05-X. OCLC 72358861.
