= Play drive =

Concept in aesthetics proposed by Friedrich Schiller

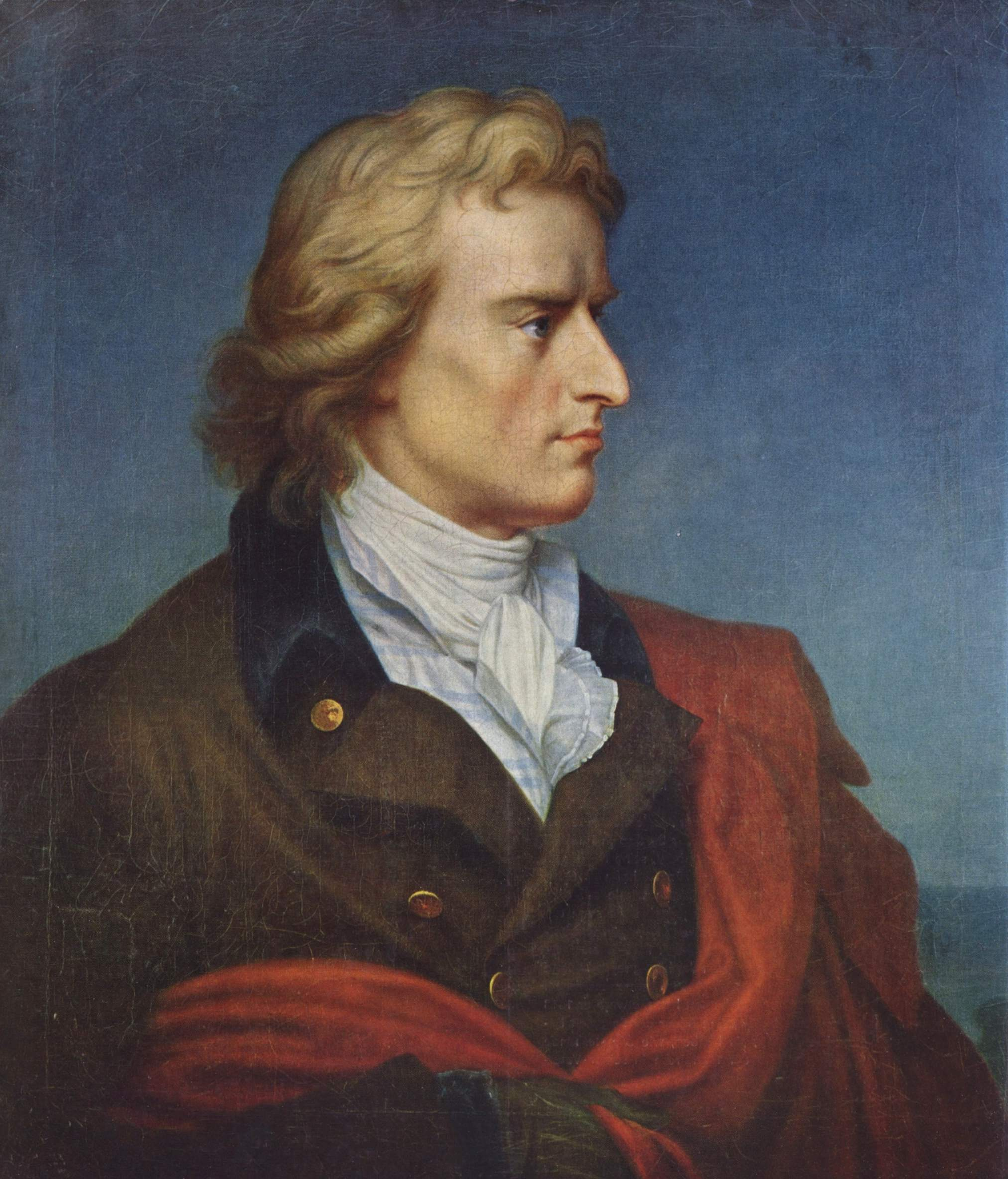
Portrait of Friedrich Schiller by Gerhard von Kügelgen

Play drive is a philosophical concept developed by Friedrich Schiller. It is a conjoining, through contradiction, of the human experience of the infinite and finite, of freedom and time, of sense and reason, and of life and form.

The object of the play drive is the living form. In contemplation of the beautiful, it allows man and woman to become most human.

To understand how Schiller reaches this conclusion, one must trace the origins of life and form, as a function of the two drives that the play drive mediates:

- the form drive and
- the sense drive.

These two drives are themselves functions of a human being's person and condition, which Schiller initially describes in terms of the absolute and time.

== Schiller's view of the human condition ==
=== Person ===
In Schiller's thought, the sense and the form drive arise out of a human being's existence as a "person", which endures, and their "condition", the determining attributes that change. He describes the person as unchangeable and eternal and endures change. "We pass from rest to activity, from passion to indifference, from agreement to contradiction; but we remain, and what proceeds directly from us remains too". This personhood is grounded in itself, and not in the contradictory state of condition.

Schiller argues that because humans are finite, condition and person have to be separate, and cannot be grounded in each other. If they were, either change would persist or the person would change. "And so we would, in the first place, have the idea of absolute being grounded upon itself, that is to say freedom". Therefore, a person is grounded in itself, and this grounding is responsible for human's idea of freedom. Freedom, defined as an absolute being grounded in itself.

=== Condition ===
While the person can be grounded in itself, Schiller's concept of condition cannot. It is already established that condition cannot be grounded in person, and must therefore proceed from something else. This "proceeding" grounds the condition in contingency, which is humanity's experience of time. "For man is not just a person situated in a particular condition. Every condition, however, every determinate existence, has its origins in time; and so man, as a phenomenal being, must also have a beginning, although the pure intelligence within him is eternal".

Humanity receives reality from the outside, as something changing within time. This changing perception is accompanied by the eternal "I" – the person – which organizes the change and variety into a unity. "The reality which the supreme intelligence creates out of itself, man has first to receive, and he does in fact receive it, by way of perception, as something existing outside of him in space, and as something changing within him in time". The perfect human being, according to Schiller, would be a constant unity amongst constant change. These seemingly contradictory forces of freedom through person and time through condition, manifest themselves in humans as the form and the sense drive. These drives, and consequently humanity's experience of freedom and time, are mediated by the play drive.

=== Sense and Form Drives ===
==== Sense Drive ====
The sense drive, in Schiller's thought, is a function of man's condition. It comes from the human being's physical existence, and the whole of their phenomenal existence stems from it. In their sensuous existence, human beings are set within the limits of time, within his condition, and becomes matter. "By matter in this context we understand nothing more than change, or reality that occupies time. Consequently this drive demands that there shall be change, that time shall have content". Therefore, sensation of the sensuous drive is time occupied by content.

==== Form Drive ====
The form drive, in Schiller's view, is a function of the person grounded in itself. This drive is humanity's rational nature, their "absolute existence", and its goal is to give them freedom, so they can bring harmony to the variety of things in the world. Because the form drive insists on the absolute, "It wants the real to be necessary and eternal, and the eternal and necessary to be real. In other words, it insist on truth and on the right". The sense drive and the form drive are in competition, and overpower one another in the person.

==== In competition ====
If the sense drive overcomes the form drive, according to Schiller, it reduces human beings to matter, but leaves them without the ability to bring this matter into unity. "As long as he merely feels, merely desires and acts upon desire, he is as yet nothing but world, if by this term we understand nothing but the formless content of time" (117). In order to not be just "world", people must exercise their form drive upon matter, and "give reality the predisposition he carries within him". When the form drive overpowers, Schiller says we experience "the greatest enlargement of being", meaning that because it is a drive toward the absolute, all limitations disappear, and instead of seeing the world finitely, as he does through the sensuous drive, "man has raised himself to a unity of ideas embracing the whole realm of phenomena".

Since the sense drive places us in time, indulging in the formal drive removes us out of time, and in doing so "We are no longer individuals; we are species". While this seems like a perfected state, it is only a point on the path of a human being reaching their maximum potential.

==== In equilibrium ====
To maximize potential of the two drives, Schiller argues, one cannot suffocate or limit the other. The perfection of the sense drive would consist in maximizing changeability and maximizing extensity. This is the development of receptivity, through which human beings present more "surface" to phenomena of the world. "The more facets his receptivity develops, the more labile it is, and the more surface it presents to phenomena, so much more world does man apprehend, and all the more potentialities does he develop in himself".

To suppress this faculty would not achieve the perfection of the form drive, rather the opposite. The perfection of the form drive is accomplished in its ability to oppose the sense drive through its endurance to change. "The more power and depth the personality achieves, and the more freedom reason attains, so much more world does man comprehend, and all the more form does he create outside of himself". Therefore, the Form drive's autonomy and intensity are maximized as a response to the maximization of the sense drive. "Where both these aptitudes are conjoined, man will combine the greatest fullness of existence with the highest autonomy and freedom and instead of losing himself to the world, will rather draw the latter into himself in all its infinitude of phenomena, and subject it to the unity of his reason" This "conjoining" of the two faculties, are actually a mediation by the third fundamental drive, the play drive.

=== Play Drive ===
The play drive mediates the demands of the sense and the form drive. "The sense drive demands that there shall be change and that time shall have a content; the form drive demands that time shall be annulled and that there shall be no change. That drive, therefore, in which both others work in concert is the play drive, reconciling becoming with absolute being and change with identity".

For the play drive to successfully mediate the two drives, human beings must learn passivity, to exercise their sense drive and become receptive of the world. They must also learn activity, to free their reason, as much as possible from the receptive. Accomplishing both, human beings are able to have a twofold experience simultaneously, "in which he were to be at once conscious of his freedom and sensible of his existence, were at one and the same time, to feel himself matter and come to know himself as mind".

Therefore, by maximizing the constraint of the absolute and the contingency of the material, the play drive negates the demands of both drives and sets people free both physically and morally. To exist in this paradoxical state, would mean to have a "complete intuition of his human nature". Furthermore, "the object that afforded him this vision would become for him the symbol of his accomplished destiny" and this would serve him as a finite embodiment of the infinite. Schiller names this object of the play drive 'living form'.

=== Living Form ===
The living form comes from a mediation of the "objects" of the sense and the form drives. The object of the sense drive, Schiller calls life. This concept designates all material being and all that is immediately present to the senses. It is a function of the human condition.

The object of the form drive, Schiller simply calls form. This concept includes all the formal qualities of things and their relationship to our reason. Schiller argues for the necessity of the interplay of the two objects in creation of a sculpture from a block of marble. "As long as we merely think about his form, it is lifeless, a mere abstraction; as long as we merely feel his life, it is formless, a mere expression. Only when his form lives in our feeling and his life takes on form in our understanding, does he become a living form". This experience of the living form, as a mediation of life and form by the play drive, is what Schiller calls the experience of beauty. "Beauty results from the reciprocal action of two opposed drives and from the uniting of two opposed principles. The highest ideal of beauty, therefore, to be sought in the most perfect possible union and equilibrium of reality and form". Therefore, in contemplation of the beautiful, people are exercising the play drive, and are fully human.

== Sources ==
Schiller, Friedrich (Sep 1, 1993). Essays. Bloomsbury. ISBN 9780826407139.
