= Ole von Uexkuell =

Swedish activist (born 1978)

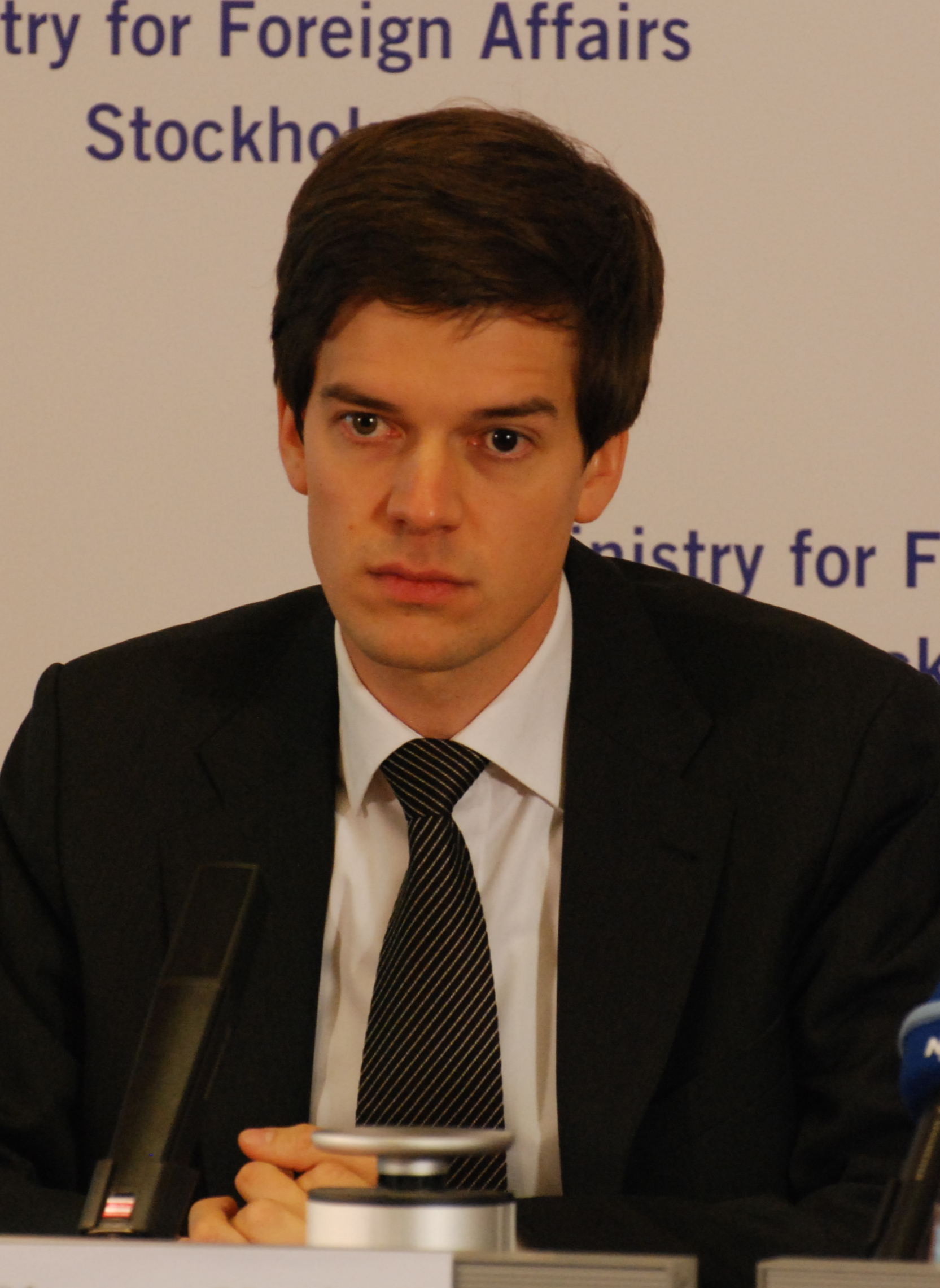
Ole von Uexküll

Jens Ole von Uexküll (born February 24, 1978) is executive director of the Stockholm-based Right Livelihood Award Foundation. Founded in 1980, the Right Livelihood Awards are given annually to people pioneering "exemplary solutions to our most urgent global problems" in the fields of the environment, human rights, peace or development.

Von Uexküll has earlier worked on renewable energy and green design with the German Parliament, UNEP's Division of Technology, Industry, and Economics in Paris and the Rocky Mountain Institute in Colorado. He is a great-grandson of the biologist Jakob von Uexküll and a nephew of the Right Livelihood Award Foundation's founder Jakob von Uexkull.
