= Battle of Daugavgrīva (1609) =

Battle on October 6, 1609 during the Polish-Swedish War

- Part of the Polish–Swedish War (1600–1611)
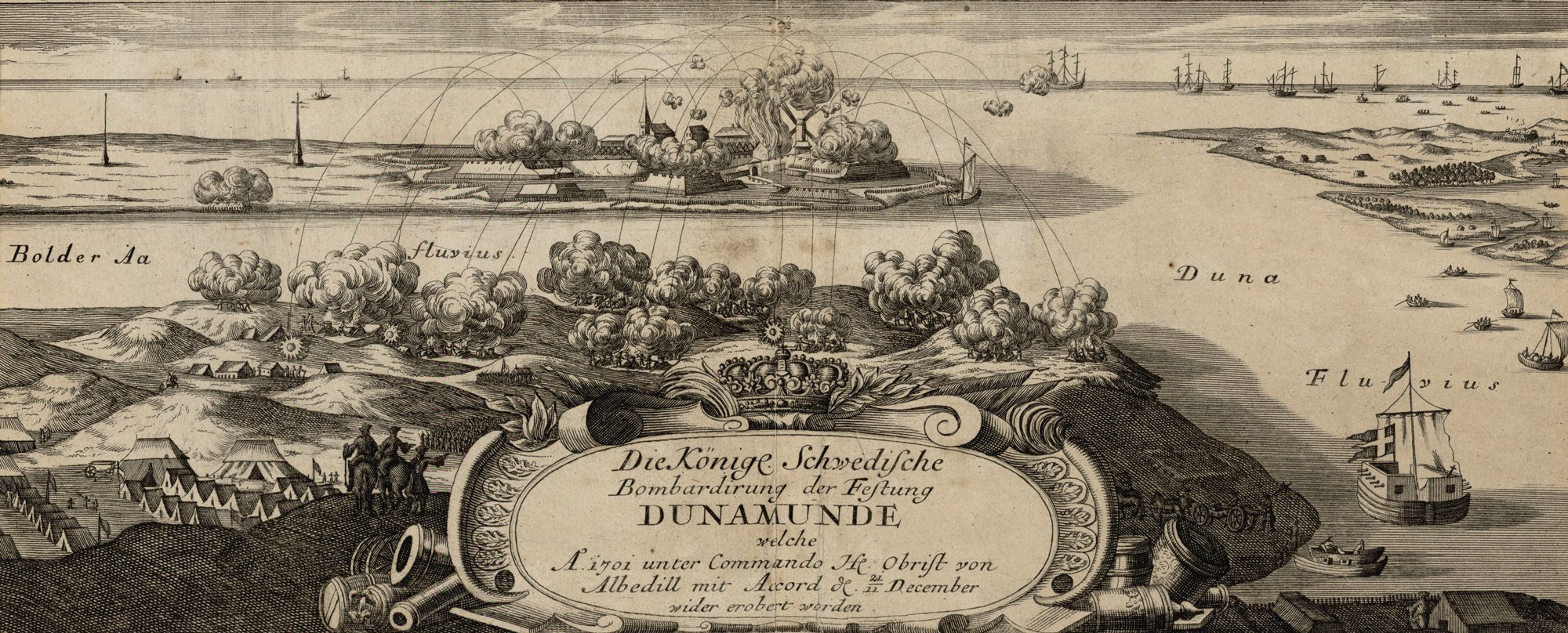
- Swedish army bombarding the fortress of Dunamunde. A 17th-century etching.
Date	October 6, 1609
Location	Daugavgrīva castle, Livonia (now in Latvia) 57°03′17″N 24°05′34″E
Result	Polish-Lithuanian victory

Belligerents
Polish–Lithuanian Commonwealth	(History of Sweden (1523–1611)) Sweden

Commanders and leaders
(Polish–Lithuanian Commonwealth) Jan Karol Chodkiewicz	(History of Sweden (1523–1611)) Joachim Frederick von Mansfeld

Strength
2,500 men	5,000 men

Casualties and losses
Unknown	Several hundred killed, 100 captured, 14 banners

The Battle of Daugavgrīva took place on October 6, 1609, during the Polish–Swedish War (1600–1611). The Poles and Lithuanians under Jan Karol Chodkiewicz's command stood victorious.

== History ==
When Jan Karol Chodkiewicz (2500 soldiers) moved in September from Pärnu to Daugavgrīva, went too him the Swedish army (5000 soldiers) under the command Joachim Frederick von Mansfeld. Lithuanian troops stopped the march on September 29 to establish a confederation in connection with overdue wages.

The arrival of October 2 Mansfeld resulted that the Polish-Lithuanian army subordinate to Chodkiewicz. Chodkiewicz, in order to unhindered besiege of Daugavgrīva castle, decided to destroy the army of Mansfeld. He, however, for four days managed to avoid battle. On the other hand, the Swedes did not manage to break through and help the starving crew of Daugavgrīva, which Lithuanians blockaded for months.

Unable to force Mansfeld to battle, Chodkiewicz prepared an ambush by the river Gauja. For this purpose, he abandoned camp, leaving a small force there. Himself with the rest of the forces hid in the nearby woods.

The Swedes couldn't resist the temptation and on 6 October attacked the weakly defended Lithuanian camp. Then Chodkiewicz ordered to attack the regiment under the leadership of Tomasz Dąbrowa. The surprising impact of the Lithuanian cavalry led to the breakdown of Mansfeld's army.

The Swedes suffered heavy losses. The victory at Daugavgriva, prejudged the Polish-Lithuanian troops regaining Daugavgrīva.

== See also ==
- Daugavgrīva castle
