= Daugavgrīva =

Neighbourhood of Riga, Latvia

- Neighborhood of Riga
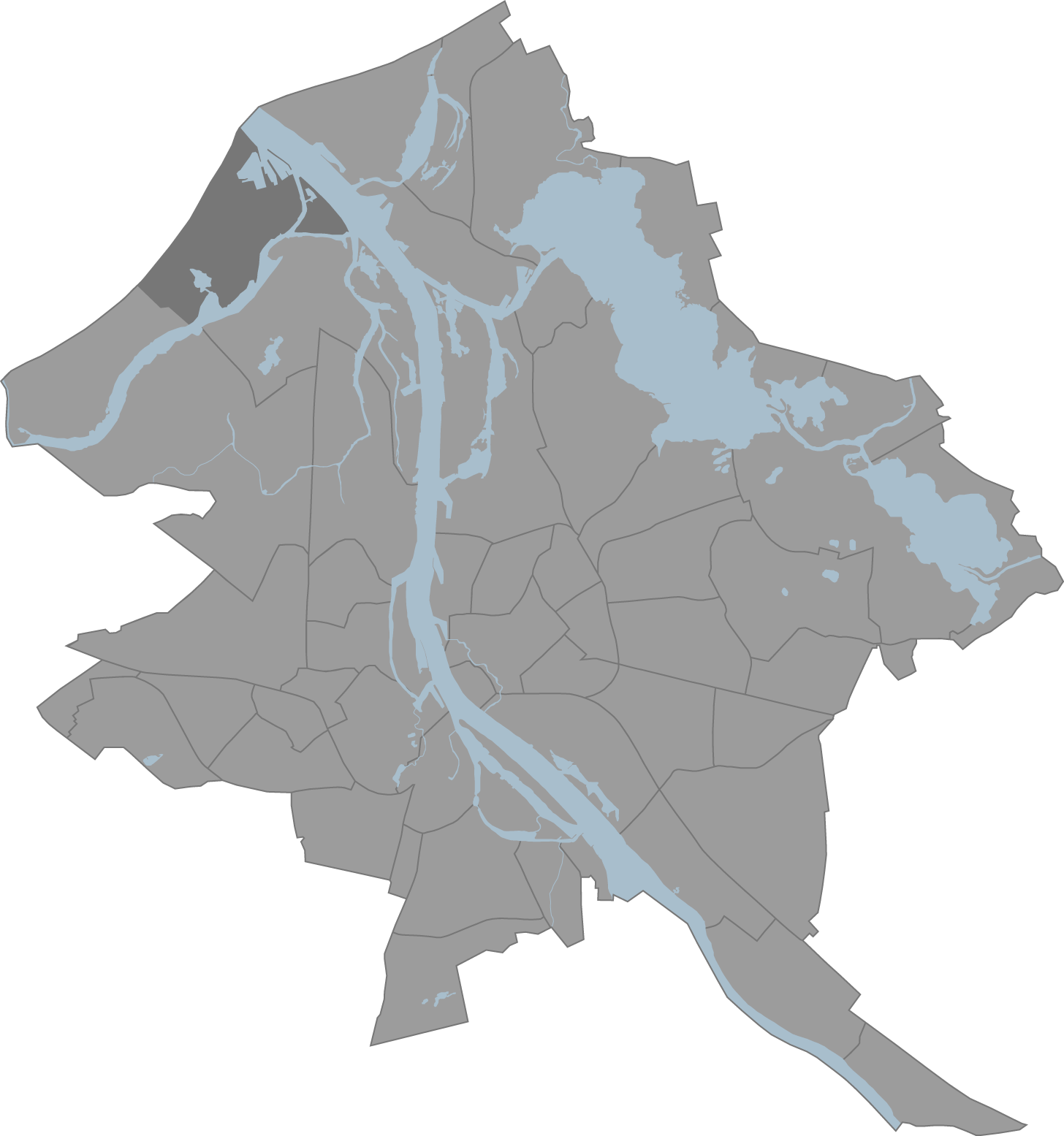
- Location in Riga
- Coordinates: 57°2′42.4″N 24°2′21.4″E
- Country: Latvia
- City: Riga
- District: Kurzemes rajons

Area
  - Total: 10.157 km^{2} (3.922 sq mi)

Population (2008)
  - Total: 9,952
  - Density: 979.8/km^{2} (2,538/sq mi)
- Time zone: UTC+2 (EET)
  - Summer (DST): UTC+3 (EEST)

Daugavgrīva (German: Dünamünde; Polish: Dyjament; Russian: Усть-Двинск or Ust`-Dvinsk) is a neighbourhood in North West Riga, Latvia on the left bank of the Daugava river. In this neighbourhood there is a Swedish-built fortress on the Daugava River's left bank, commanding its mouth.

== Fortress ==
In Vecdaugava, on the right or opposite side of the Daugava (German: Düna) outside the borders of the contemporary neighborhood, was in 1208 Dünamünde castle built by the Teutonic Knights, which initially served as a monastery. The Swedish fortress of Neumünde on the right bank, designed in a Dutch style by General Rothenburg in 1641, replaced the ruined Dünamünde Castle by 1680.

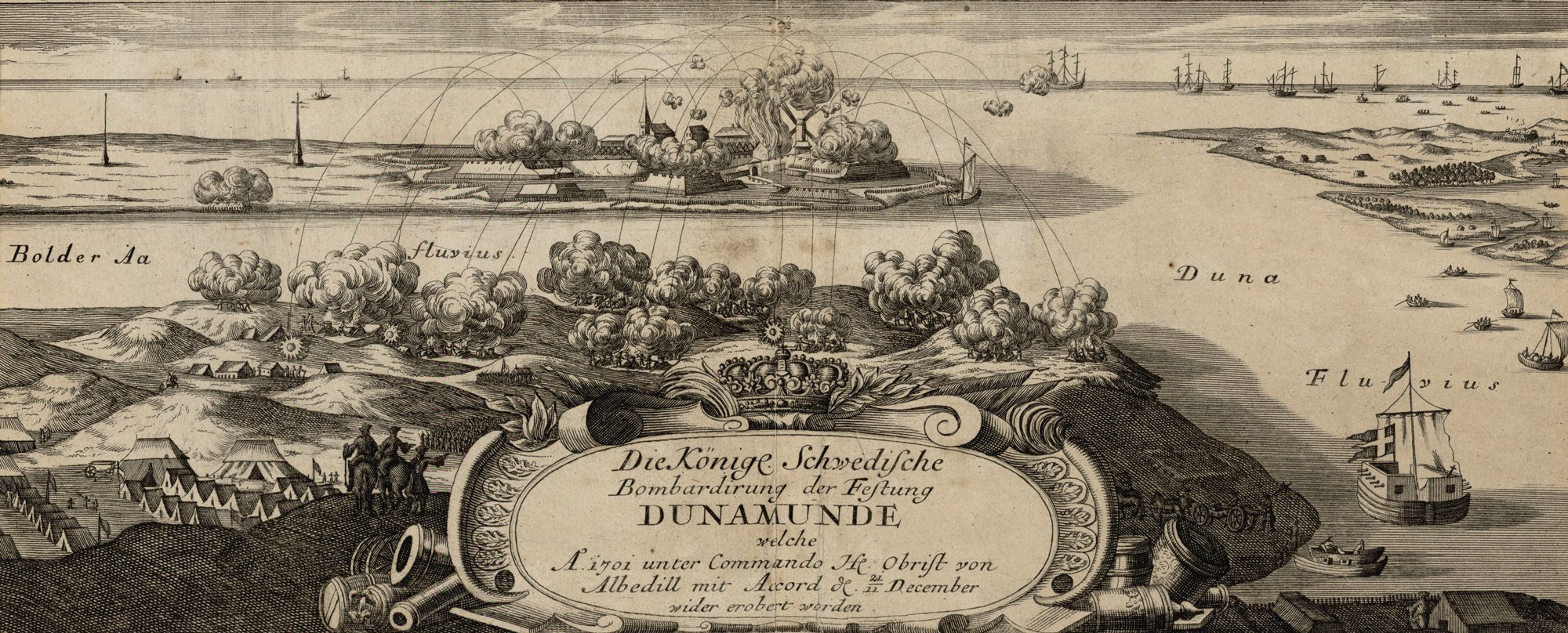
The Swedish army bombarding the fortress of Dünamünde.

In 1695 the Commandant was captain Heinrich Nicolaus Rüdinger, forefather of future Patriarch Alexy II of Russia. Rüdinger was knighted by Charles XI of Sweden. Joachim Cronman later became the Commandant and he died on March 5, 1703.

After the fortress was seized by the Russians they reconstructed it. Regent Anna Leopoldovna of Russia, her husband Anthony Ulrich, and her son Ivan VI were incarcerated in Dünamünde in 1742.

A local Lutheran church was rebuilt into the Orthodox Church of the Saviour's Transfiguration in 1775.

The Russian government renamed the fortress, where only Russian soldiers were living, to Ust-Dvinsk in 1893. They had its fortifications completely reconstructed prior to World War I. During the war Ust-Dvinsk was bombarded by the Schütte-Lanz Airship SL 7 of the German Army. After the fortress was taken by Imperial Germany, it was inspected by Emperor Wilhelm II in 1917. The Latvian government, however, demolished much of the fortifications several years later. During the Cold War Ust-Dvinsk was a base for Soviet troops. The site is now known in Latvian as Daugavgrīva. There is a functional lighthouse at Daugavgrīva which was originally built in 1818. It was rebuilt in 1863, 1920, and after World War II.

In March 1942 took place the so-called "Dünamünde Action". The Nazis informed the Judenrat of the ghetto of Riga that the people would go to a supposed town called Dünamünde to work at fish processing. Instead the people were taken by motor transport to Biķernieki forest, where they were shot and buried in common unmarked graves.
