= Vecdaugava =

Neighborhood of Riga, Latvia

Coordinates: 57°03′N 24°06′E

- Neighbourhood of Riga
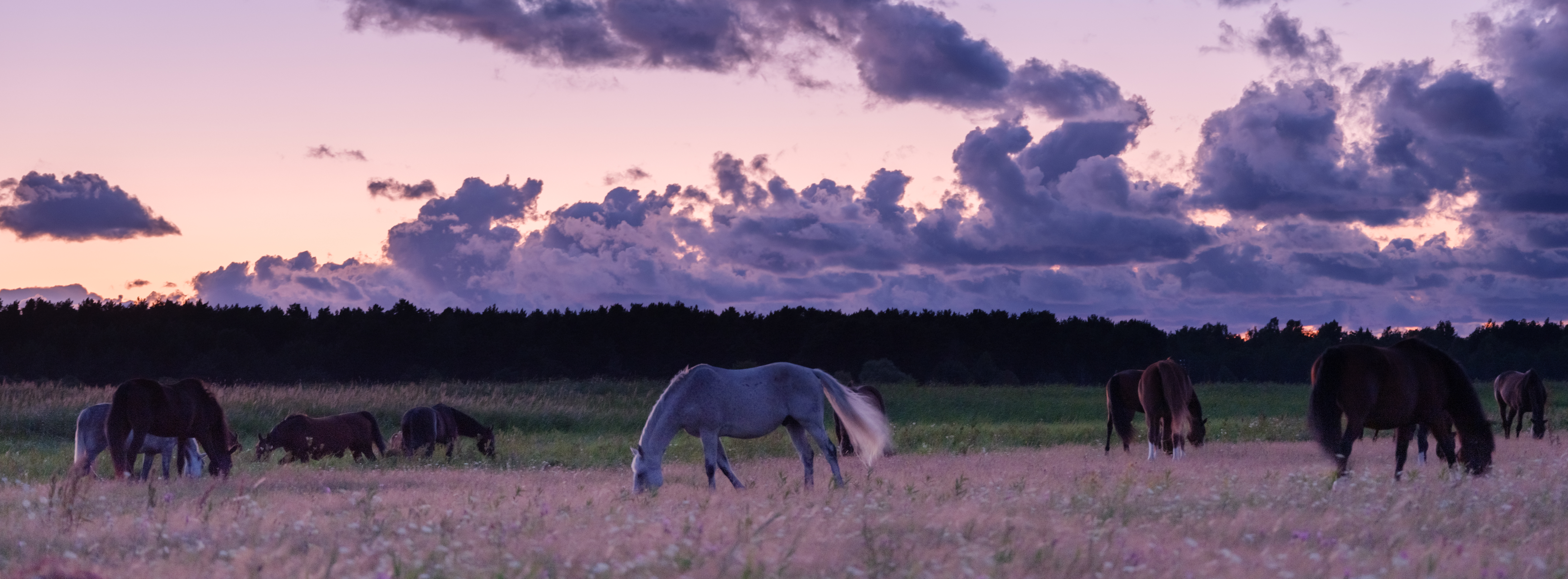
- Horses at pasture in Vecdaugava

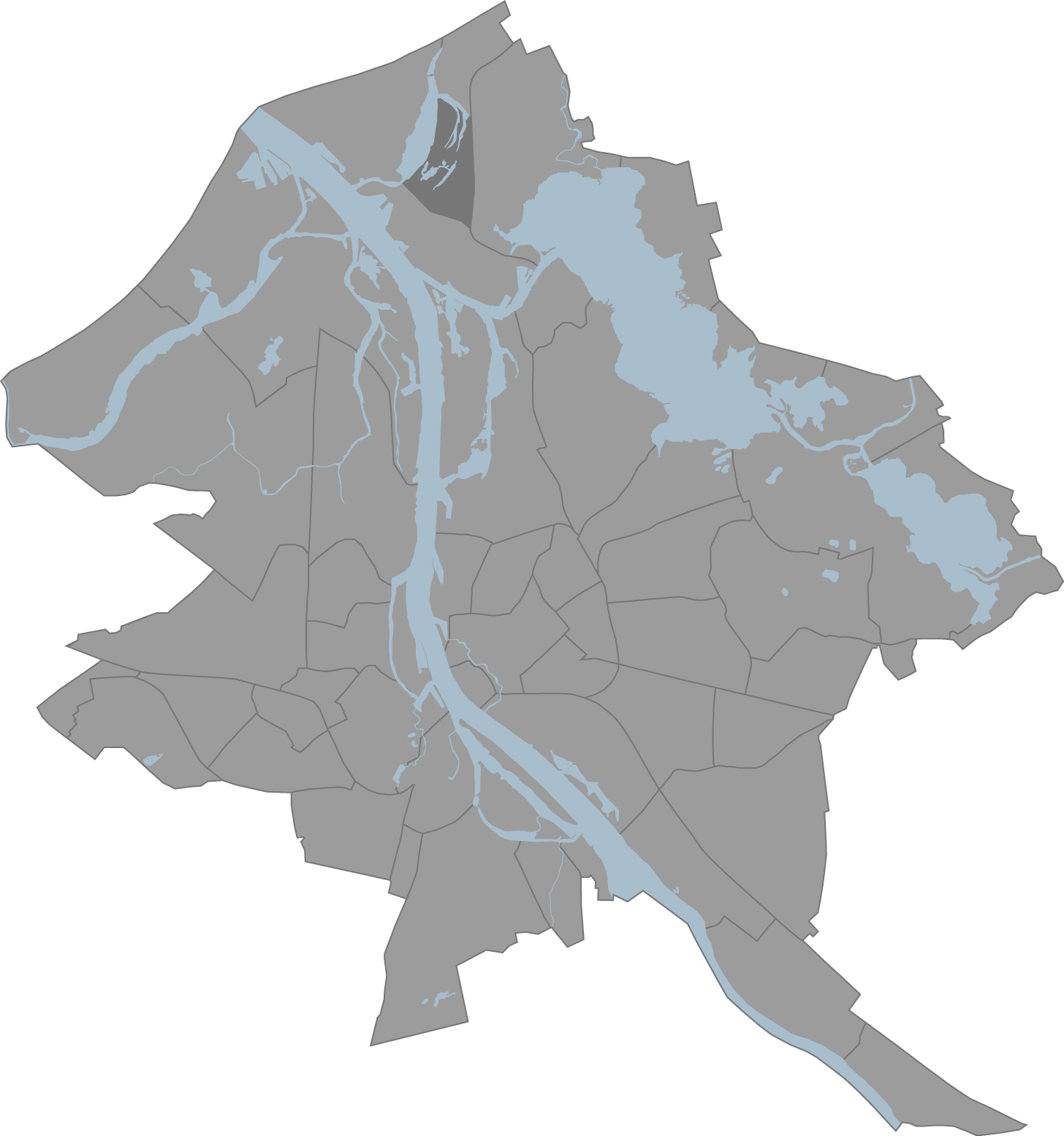
- Location of Vecdaugava in Riga
- Country: Latvia
- City: Riga
- District: Northern District

Area
  - Total: 3.066 km^{2} (1.184 sq mi)

Population (2017)
  - Total: 1,393
  - Density: 454.3/km^{2} (1,177/sq mi)
- Website: apkaimes.lv

Vecdaugava is a neighbourhood of Riga, the capital of Latvia.
