= Johann von Uexküll =

Baltic German noble and politician

Johann von Uexküll (or Johann von Mentz (Menzen = Mõniste manor)) (Died 1583) was Hofmarschall of Magnus, Duke of Holstein from 1560 to 1571 and the Danish Governor of Ösel from 1576 to 1579.

In 1560, the king of Denmark bought the Bishopric of Ösel-Wiek from the last prince-bishop. The possession was given as an appanage to Magnus Herzog von Holstein, the brother of the king Frederick II of Denmark. Danmark ceded Wiek (Läänemaa) to Poland in exchange for Livonian possessions in Ösel. In 1572, Ösel was transferred to direct administration by Denmark. In 1645, it was ceded from Denmark to Sweden by the Treaty of Brömsebro. During the Livonian War in 1561, northern Estonia submitted to Swedish control, while southern Estonia briefly came under the control of Poland in the 1580s. In 1629, mainland Estonia came entirely under Swedish rule. Estonia was administratively divided between the provinces of Estonia in the north and Livonia in southern Estonia and northern Latvia, a division which persisted until the early 20th century.

== See also ==
- Danish Estonia
- Vironians
- Northern Crusades
- First Swedish Crusade, Second Swedish Crusade and Third Swedish Crusade
- History of Estonia
- History of Finland
- History of Latvia
- History of Lithuania
