= Carl Wolmar Jakob von Uexküll =

Swedish-German writer, lecturer, philanthropist, activist, and politician (born 1944)

Jakob Freiherr von Uexküll
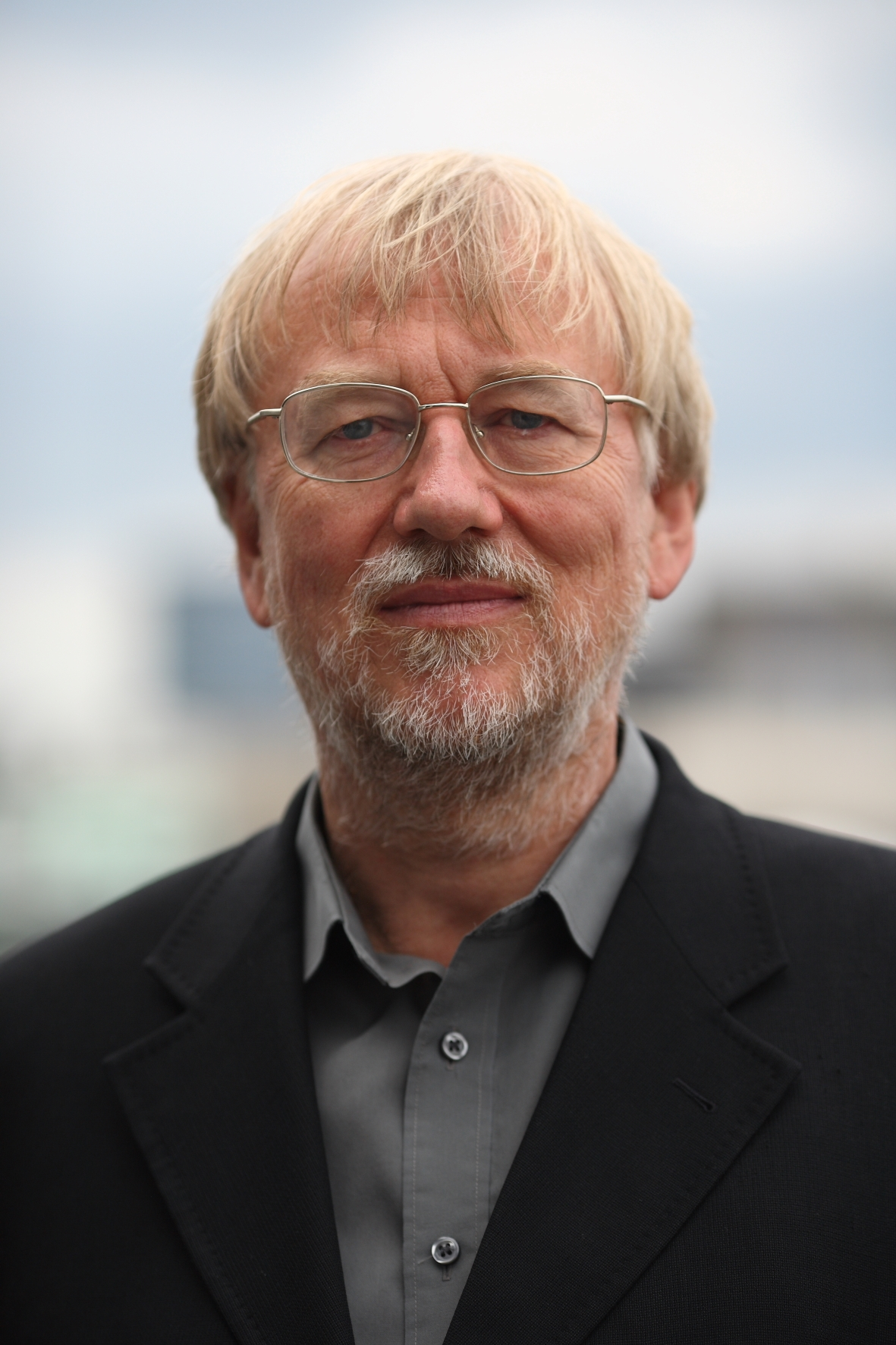
- Uexküll in 2008

Member of the European Parliament for Germany
- In office 1987–1989

Personal details
- Born: 19 August 1944 (age 82) Uppsala, Sweden
- Party: Alliance 90/The Greens (Germany)
- Occupation: Writer, lecturer, former member of the European Parliament

Carl Wolmar Jakob Freiherr von Uexküll (born 19 August 1944) is a Swedish-German writer, lecturer, philanthropist, activist and former politician. He served as a member of the European Parliament from 1987 to 1989 representing the German Green Party. In 1980, Uexküll founded the Right Livelihood Award, and in 2006, he co-founded the World Future Council. Born in Sweden, he holds both Swedish and German citizenship, and is a resident of the United Kingdom.

== Biography ==
The son of Gustav Adolf Gösta Baron von Uexküll and Ewa Lewerentz, Jakob von Uexküll was born in Uppsala, Sweden of a noble Baltic German family that left Estonia after World War I. After studying in Sweden and Germany, he won a scholarship to Christ Church, Oxford, graduating in Philosophy, Politics and Economics.

His paternal grandfather Jakob von Uexküll was a biologist and the founder of the study of biosemiotics. His maternal grandfather was renowned Swedish architect Sigurd Lewerentz. Uexküll is married and has three children. He lives with his family in London.

== Right Livelihood Award ==
The Right Livelihood Award evolved from von Uexküll's opinion that the Nobel Prizes were relatively narrow in scope and usually recognised the work of citizens in industrialised countries. Uexküll first approached the Nobel Foundation with the suggestion that it establish two new awards, one for ecology and one relevant to the lives of the poor majority of the world's population. He offered to contribute financially but his proposal was turned down.

Uexküll then created the Right Livelihood Award and provided an initial endowment by selling his collection of postage stamps for US$1 million; the awards have subsequently attracted additional funding from private individuals enabling the donation of annual prizes worth 150,000 euro. In 1980, the first Right Livelihood Awards were bestowed in a rented hall. Five years later, the invitation to present them in the Riksdag (Swedish parliament) in Stockholm followed. Since 2005 his nephew Ole von Uexküll has taken over the management of the Right Livelihood Award.

== Activism ==
In Germany, Alliance 90/The Greens has several times nominated Jakob von Uexküll in elections to the European Parliament. As a member of the European Parliament (1987–89), he served on the Political Affairs Committee and the Science and Technology Committee. He was also a member of the Delegation for Relations with the Supreme Soviet of the USSR and the Baltic Intergroup.

Uexküll is co-founder of the Other Economic Summit (1984), and founder of the Estonian Renaissance Award (1993). He is a patron of Friends of the Earth International, member of the Council of Governance of Transparency International, and of the Global Commission to Fund the United Nations. He served on the board of Greenpeace, Germany, and the New Economics Foundation, London. He was also a member of the UNESCO Commission on Human Duties and Responsibilities. Uexküll lectures on environment, justice and peace issues. He is also a philatelist with publications including The Early Postal History of Saudi Arabia (London, 2001). In 2007, Uexküll founded the World Future Council.

== Honours and prizes ==
- Officer's Cross of the Order Merit of the Federal Republic of Germany (2009)
- Erich Fromm Prize in Stuttgart, Germany (2008)
- Great Binding Prize for Environmental Protection, Liechtenstein (2006)
- Time magazine European Heroes Award (2005)
- Third Class Order of the Cross of Terra Mariana, Estonia (2001)
- Future Research Prize, Salzburg (1999)
- Bios Prize, St. Petersburg (1998)
- Patron, International Student Week in Ilmenau (ISWI) 2015
- Illis quorum (2014)
